

70001–70100 

|-bgcolor=#d6d6d6
| 70001 ||  || — || December 8, 1998 || Kitt Peak || Spacewatch || — || align=right | 6.3 km || 
|-id=002 bgcolor=#d6d6d6
| 70002 ||  || — || December 7, 1998 || Caussols || ODAS || THM || align=right | 6.2 km || 
|-id=003 bgcolor=#d6d6d6
| 70003 ||  || — || December 15, 1998 || Višnjan Observatory || K. Korlević || 7:4 || align=right | 8.7 km || 
|-id=004 bgcolor=#d6d6d6
| 70004 ||  || — || December 15, 1998 || Caussols || ODAS || — || align=right | 7.4 km || 
|-id=005 bgcolor=#d6d6d6
| 70005 ||  || — || December 14, 1998 || Socorro || LINEAR || — || align=right | 16 km || 
|-id=006 bgcolor=#d6d6d6
| 70006 ||  || — || December 14, 1998 || Socorro || LINEAR || — || align=right | 4.5 km || 
|-id=007 bgcolor=#d6d6d6
| 70007 ||  || — || December 14, 1998 || Socorro || LINEAR || — || align=right | 12 km || 
|-id=008 bgcolor=#d6d6d6
| 70008 ||  || — || December 14, 1998 || Socorro || LINEAR || ALA || align=right | 14 km || 
|-id=009 bgcolor=#d6d6d6
| 70009 ||  || — || December 14, 1998 || Socorro || LINEAR || — || align=right | 13 km || 
|-id=010 bgcolor=#d6d6d6
| 70010 ||  || — || December 14, 1998 || Socorro || LINEAR || LIX || align=right | 9.4 km || 
|-id=011 bgcolor=#d6d6d6
| 70011 ||  || — || December 14, 1998 || Socorro || LINEAR || — || align=right | 6.2 km || 
|-id=012 bgcolor=#d6d6d6
| 70012 ||  || — || December 15, 1998 || Socorro || LINEAR || — || align=right | 8.1 km || 
|-id=013 bgcolor=#d6d6d6
| 70013 ||  || — || December 15, 1998 || Socorro || LINEAR || — || align=right | 6.8 km || 
|-id=014 bgcolor=#d6d6d6
| 70014 ||  || — || December 17, 1998 || Oizumi || T. Kobayashi || THM || align=right | 6.7 km || 
|-id=015 bgcolor=#d6d6d6
| 70015 ||  || — || December 19, 1998 || Prescott || P. G. Comba || — || align=right | 6.3 km || 
|-id=016 bgcolor=#d6d6d6
| 70016 ||  || — || December 22, 1998 || Catalina || CSS || EUP || align=right | 11 km || 
|-id=017 bgcolor=#d6d6d6
| 70017 ||  || — || December 26, 1998 || Prescott || P. G. Comba || — || align=right | 5.9 km || 
|-id=018 bgcolor=#d6d6d6
| 70018 ||  || — || December 25, 1998 || Višnjan Observatory || K. Korlević, M. Jurić || HYG || align=right | 7.6 km || 
|-id=019 bgcolor=#d6d6d6
| 70019 ||  || — || December 27, 1998 || Oizumi || T. Kobayashi || EOS || align=right | 7.5 km || 
|-id=020 bgcolor=#d6d6d6
| 70020 ||  || — || December 27, 1998 || Anderson Mesa || LONEOS || — || align=right | 10 km || 
|-id=021 bgcolor=#d6d6d6
| 70021 || 1999 AB || — || January 3, 1999 || Oizumi || T. Kobayashi || ALA || align=right | 11 km || 
|-id=022 bgcolor=#d6d6d6
| 70022 ||  || — || January 9, 1999 || Višnjan Observatory || K. Korlević || — || align=right | 12 km || 
|-id=023 bgcolor=#d6d6d6
| 70023 ||  || — || January 8, 1999 || Kitt Peak || Spacewatch || — || align=right | 8.9 km || 
|-id=024 bgcolor=#fefefe
| 70024 ||  || — || January 13, 1999 || Socorro || LINEAR || H || align=right | 1.0 km || 
|-id=025 bgcolor=#fefefe
| 70025 ||  || — || January 19, 1999 || Catalina || CSS || H || align=right | 1.5 km || 
|-id=026 bgcolor=#d6d6d6
| 70026 ||  || — || January 20, 1999 || Giesing Obs. || P. Sala || — || align=right | 5.5 km || 
|-id=027 bgcolor=#d6d6d6
| 70027 ||  || — || January 18, 1999 || Xinglong || SCAP || — || align=right | 18 km || 
|-id=028 bgcolor=#d6d6d6
| 70028 ||  || — || January 16, 1999 || Socorro || LINEAR || — || align=right | 5.0 km || 
|-id=029 bgcolor=#d6d6d6
| 70029 || 1999 CB || — || February 4, 1999 || Oizumi || T. Kobayashi || — || align=right | 16 km || 
|-id=030 bgcolor=#fefefe
| 70030 Margaretmiller ||  ||  || February 7, 1999 || Palmer Divide || B. D. Warner || H || align=right | 1.4 km || 
|-id=031 bgcolor=#fefefe
| 70031 ||  || — || February 10, 1999 || Socorro || LINEAR || H || align=right | 1.4 km || 
|-id=032 bgcolor=#d6d6d6
| 70032 ||  || — || February 13, 1999 || Anderson Mesa || LONEOS || 7:4* || align=right | 15 km || 
|-id=033 bgcolor=#d6d6d6
| 70033 ||  || — || February 10, 1999 || Socorro || LINEAR || HYG || align=right | 7.5 km || 
|-id=034 bgcolor=#d6d6d6
| 70034 ||  || — || February 10, 1999 || Socorro || LINEAR || — || align=right | 6.9 km || 
|-id=035 bgcolor=#d6d6d6
| 70035 ||  || — || February 10, 1999 || Socorro || LINEAR || LIX || align=right | 9.8 km || 
|-id=036 bgcolor=#d6d6d6
| 70036 ||  || — || February 10, 1999 || Socorro || LINEAR || — || align=right | 6.5 km || 
|-id=037 bgcolor=#d6d6d6
| 70037 ||  || — || February 12, 1999 || Socorro || LINEAR || — || align=right | 8.9 km || 
|-id=038 bgcolor=#d6d6d6
| 70038 ||  || — || February 12, 1999 || Socorro || LINEAR || — || align=right | 12 km || 
|-id=039 bgcolor=#d6d6d6
| 70039 ||  || — || February 10, 1999 || Socorro || LINEAR || — || align=right | 6.8 km || 
|-id=040 bgcolor=#d6d6d6
| 70040 ||  || — || February 10, 1999 || Socorro || LINEAR || EOS || align=right | 5.6 km || 
|-id=041 bgcolor=#d6d6d6
| 70041 ||  || — || February 12, 1999 || Socorro || LINEAR || — || align=right | 12 km || 
|-id=042 bgcolor=#d6d6d6
| 70042 ||  || — || February 11, 1999 || Socorro || LINEAR || MEL || align=right | 12 km || 
|-id=043 bgcolor=#d6d6d6
| 70043 ||  || — || February 11, 1999 || Socorro || LINEAR || — || align=right | 4.8 km || 
|-id=044 bgcolor=#fefefe
| 70044 ||  || — || February 18, 1999 || Kitt Peak || Spacewatch || — || align=right | 1.2 km || 
|-id=045 bgcolor=#d6d6d6
| 70045 ||  || — || February 17, 1999 || Socorro || LINEAR || — || align=right | 12 km || 
|-id=046 bgcolor=#fefefe
| 70046 ||  || — || March 10, 1999 || Kitt Peak || Spacewatch || — || align=right | 1.1 km || 
|-id=047 bgcolor=#E9E9E9
| 70047 ||  || — || March 16, 1999 || Višnjan Observatory || K. Korlević || — || align=right | 5.0 km || 
|-id=048 bgcolor=#d6d6d6
| 70048 ||  || — || March 20, 1999 || Socorro || LINEAR || — || align=right | 12 km || 
|-id=049 bgcolor=#fefefe
| 70049 ||  || — || April 7, 1999 || Socorro || LINEAR || — || align=right | 2.0 km || 
|-id=050 bgcolor=#d6d6d6
| 70050 ||  || — || April 12, 1999 || Socorro || LINEAR || — || align=right | 6.6 km || 
|-id=051 bgcolor=#fefefe
| 70051 ||  || — || April 12, 1999 || Socorro || LINEAR || — || align=right | 1.7 km || 
|-id=052 bgcolor=#fefefe
| 70052 ||  || — || April 15, 1999 || Socorro || LINEAR || — || align=right | 1.7 km || 
|-id=053 bgcolor=#fefefe
| 70053 ||  || — || April 17, 1999 || Socorro || LINEAR || — || align=right | 2.1 km || 
|-id=054 bgcolor=#fefefe
| 70054 ||  || — || April 17, 1999 || Socorro || LINEAR || — || align=right | 1.6 km || 
|-id=055 bgcolor=#FA8072
| 70055 ||  || — || May 12, 1999 || Socorro || LINEAR || — || align=right | 2.5 km || 
|-id=056 bgcolor=#FA8072
| 70056 ||  || — || May 12, 1999 || Socorro || LINEAR || PHO || align=right | 2.7 km || 
|-id=057 bgcolor=#fefefe
| 70057 ||  || — || May 12, 1999 || Woomera || F. B. Zoltowski || — || align=right | 1.4 km || 
|-id=058 bgcolor=#fefefe
| 70058 ||  || — || May 15, 1999 || Kitt Peak || Spacewatch || — || align=right | 2.2 km || 
|-id=059 bgcolor=#fefefe
| 70059 ||  || — || May 10, 1999 || Socorro || LINEAR || — || align=right | 1.8 km || 
|-id=060 bgcolor=#fefefe
| 70060 ||  || — || May 10, 1999 || Socorro || LINEAR || — || align=right | 2.2 km || 
|-id=061 bgcolor=#fefefe
| 70061 ||  || — || May 10, 1999 || Socorro || LINEAR || FLO || align=right | 1.3 km || 
|-id=062 bgcolor=#fefefe
| 70062 ||  || — || May 10, 1999 || Socorro || LINEAR || NYS || align=right | 1.9 km || 
|-id=063 bgcolor=#fefefe
| 70063 ||  || — || May 10, 1999 || Socorro || LINEAR || FLO || align=right | 2.8 km || 
|-id=064 bgcolor=#fefefe
| 70064 ||  || — || May 10, 1999 || Socorro || LINEAR || — || align=right | 1.5 km || 
|-id=065 bgcolor=#fefefe
| 70065 ||  || — || May 10, 1999 || Socorro || LINEAR || FLO || align=right | 1.3 km || 
|-id=066 bgcolor=#fefefe
| 70066 ||  || — || May 10, 1999 || Socorro || LINEAR || V || align=right | 1.9 km || 
|-id=067 bgcolor=#fefefe
| 70067 ||  || — || May 10, 1999 || Socorro || LINEAR || — || align=right | 2.5 km || 
|-id=068 bgcolor=#fefefe
| 70068 ||  || — || May 10, 1999 || Socorro || LINEAR || — || align=right | 1.4 km || 
|-id=069 bgcolor=#fefefe
| 70069 ||  || — || May 10, 1999 || Socorro || LINEAR || — || align=right | 2.2 km || 
|-id=070 bgcolor=#fefefe
| 70070 ||  || — || May 10, 1999 || Socorro || LINEAR || — || align=right | 1.8 km || 
|-id=071 bgcolor=#fefefe
| 70071 ||  || — || May 10, 1999 || Socorro || LINEAR || — || align=right | 1.6 km || 
|-id=072 bgcolor=#fefefe
| 70072 ||  || — || May 10, 1999 || Socorro || LINEAR || V || align=right | 1.6 km || 
|-id=073 bgcolor=#fefefe
| 70073 ||  || — || May 10, 1999 || Socorro || LINEAR || ERI || align=right | 2.8 km || 
|-id=074 bgcolor=#fefefe
| 70074 ||  || — || May 10, 1999 || Socorro || LINEAR || — || align=right | 6.1 km || 
|-id=075 bgcolor=#fefefe
| 70075 ||  || — || May 10, 1999 || Socorro || LINEAR || — || align=right | 1.5 km || 
|-id=076 bgcolor=#fefefe
| 70076 ||  || — || May 10, 1999 || Socorro || LINEAR || FLO || align=right | 2.2 km || 
|-id=077 bgcolor=#fefefe
| 70077 ||  || — || May 10, 1999 || Socorro || LINEAR || FLO || align=right | 1.5 km || 
|-id=078 bgcolor=#fefefe
| 70078 ||  || — || May 10, 1999 || Socorro || LINEAR || — || align=right | 2.0 km || 
|-id=079 bgcolor=#fefefe
| 70079 ||  || — || May 10, 1999 || Socorro || LINEAR || — || align=right | 2.0 km || 
|-id=080 bgcolor=#fefefe
| 70080 ||  || — || May 10, 1999 || Socorro || LINEAR || FLO || align=right | 2.2 km || 
|-id=081 bgcolor=#fefefe
| 70081 ||  || — || May 10, 1999 || Socorro || LINEAR || — || align=right | 2.7 km || 
|-id=082 bgcolor=#fefefe
| 70082 ||  || — || May 10, 1999 || Socorro || LINEAR || — || align=right | 1.8 km || 
|-id=083 bgcolor=#fefefe
| 70083 ||  || — || May 10, 1999 || Socorro || LINEAR || — || align=right | 1.8 km || 
|-id=084 bgcolor=#fefefe
| 70084 ||  || — || May 12, 1999 || Socorro || LINEAR || — || align=right | 5.0 km || 
|-id=085 bgcolor=#fefefe
| 70085 ||  || — || May 12, 1999 || Socorro || LINEAR || V || align=right | 1.9 km || 
|-id=086 bgcolor=#fefefe
| 70086 ||  || — || May 12, 1999 || Socorro || LINEAR || — || align=right | 2.0 km || 
|-id=087 bgcolor=#fefefe
| 70087 ||  || — || May 12, 1999 || Socorro || LINEAR || — || align=right | 2.0 km || 
|-id=088 bgcolor=#fefefe
| 70088 ||  || — || May 12, 1999 || Socorro || LINEAR || — || align=right | 1.8 km || 
|-id=089 bgcolor=#fefefe
| 70089 ||  || — || May 10, 1999 || Socorro || LINEAR || — || align=right | 2.0 km || 
|-id=090 bgcolor=#fefefe
| 70090 ||  || — || May 10, 1999 || Socorro || LINEAR || — || align=right | 2.7 km || 
|-id=091 bgcolor=#fefefe
| 70091 ||  || — || May 12, 1999 || Socorro || LINEAR || — || align=right | 2.6 km || 
|-id=092 bgcolor=#fefefe
| 70092 ||  || — || May 12, 1999 || Socorro || LINEAR || V || align=right | 1.3 km || 
|-id=093 bgcolor=#fefefe
| 70093 ||  || — || May 13, 1999 || Socorro || LINEAR || — || align=right | 1.4 km || 
|-id=094 bgcolor=#fefefe
| 70094 ||  || — || May 13, 1999 || Socorro || LINEAR || — || align=right | 1.6 km || 
|-id=095 bgcolor=#fefefe
| 70095 ||  || — || May 13, 1999 || Socorro || LINEAR || — || align=right | 2.5 km || 
|-id=096 bgcolor=#fefefe
| 70096 ||  || — || May 13, 1999 || Socorro || LINEAR || — || align=right | 4.2 km || 
|-id=097 bgcolor=#fefefe
| 70097 ||  || — || May 13, 1999 || Socorro || LINEAR || NYS || align=right | 1.3 km || 
|-id=098 bgcolor=#fefefe
| 70098 ||  || — || May 13, 1999 || Socorro || LINEAR || FLO || align=right | 1.6 km || 
|-id=099 bgcolor=#fefefe
| 70099 ||  || — || May 13, 1999 || Socorro || LINEAR || FLO || align=right | 1.4 km || 
|-id=100 bgcolor=#fefefe
| 70100 ||  || — || May 13, 1999 || Socorro || LINEAR || FLO || align=right | 2.2 km || 
|}

70101–70200 

|-bgcolor=#fefefe
| 70101 ||  || — || May 13, 1999 || Socorro || LINEAR || FLO || align=right | 2.1 km || 
|-id=102 bgcolor=#fefefe
| 70102 ||  || — || May 13, 1999 || Socorro || LINEAR || — || align=right | 1.5 km || 
|-id=103 bgcolor=#fefefe
| 70103 ||  || — || May 13, 1999 || Socorro || LINEAR || — || align=right | 1.3 km || 
|-id=104 bgcolor=#d6d6d6
| 70104 ||  || — || May 8, 1999 || Socorro || LINEAR || ALA || align=right | 17 km || 
|-id=105 bgcolor=#fefefe
| 70105 ||  || — || May 17, 1999 || Socorro || LINEAR || FLO || align=right | 1.3 km || 
|-id=106 bgcolor=#fefefe
| 70106 ||  || — || May 18, 1999 || Socorro || LINEAR || FLO || align=right | 2.6 km || 
|-id=107 bgcolor=#fefefe
| 70107 ||  || — || May 18, 1999 || Socorro || LINEAR || FLO || align=right | 1.6 km || 
|-id=108 bgcolor=#fefefe
| 70108 ||  || — || May 18, 1999 || Socorro || LINEAR || FLO || align=right | 1.7 km || 
|-id=109 bgcolor=#fefefe
| 70109 ||  || — || May 17, 1999 || Anderson Mesa || LONEOS || — || align=right | 2.1 km || 
|-id=110 bgcolor=#fefefe
| 70110 || 1999 LK || — || June 6, 1999 || Goodricke-Pigott || R. A. Tucker || — || align=right | 2.4 km || 
|-id=111 bgcolor=#FA8072
| 70111 ||  || — || June 9, 1999 || Catalina || CSS || — || align=right | 2.0 km || 
|-id=112 bgcolor=#fefefe
| 70112 ||  || — || June 8, 1999 || Socorro || LINEAR || FLO || align=right | 1.7 km || 
|-id=113 bgcolor=#fefefe
| 70113 ||  || — || June 8, 1999 || Socorro || LINEAR || — || align=right | 1.8 km || 
|-id=114 bgcolor=#fefefe
| 70114 ||  || — || June 9, 1999 || Socorro || LINEAR || FLO || align=right | 2.0 km || 
|-id=115 bgcolor=#fefefe
| 70115 ||  || — || June 9, 1999 || Socorro || LINEAR || — || align=right | 2.0 km || 
|-id=116 bgcolor=#fefefe
| 70116 ||  || — || June 9, 1999 || Socorro || LINEAR || — || align=right | 1.9 km || 
|-id=117 bgcolor=#fefefe
| 70117 ||  || — || June 9, 1999 || Socorro || LINEAR || FLO || align=right | 1.8 km || 
|-id=118 bgcolor=#fefefe
| 70118 ||  || — || June 9, 1999 || Socorro || LINEAR || FLO || align=right | 1.9 km || 
|-id=119 bgcolor=#fefefe
| 70119 ||  || — || June 7, 1999 || Kitt Peak || Spacewatch || — || align=right | 1.3 km || 
|-id=120 bgcolor=#fefefe
| 70120 ||  || — || June 11, 1999 || Catalina || CSS || FLO || align=right | 1.9 km || 
|-id=121 bgcolor=#fefefe
| 70121 ||  || — || June 13, 1999 || Anderson Mesa || LONEOS || FLO || align=right | 2.3 km || 
|-id=122 bgcolor=#fefefe
| 70122 || 1999 MX || — || June 22, 1999 || Woomera || F. B. Zoltowski || FLO || align=right | 4.0 km || 
|-id=123 bgcolor=#fefefe
| 70123 ||  || — || June 24, 1999 || Woomera || F. B. Zoltowski || V || align=right | 1.5 km || 
|-id=124 bgcolor=#fefefe
| 70124 || 1999 NY || — || July 10, 1999 || Woomera || F. B. Zoltowski || MAS || align=right | 1.4 km || 
|-id=125 bgcolor=#fefefe
| 70125 || 1999 NZ || — || July 7, 1999 || Višnjan Observatory || K. Korlević || — || align=right | 3.6 km || 
|-id=126 bgcolor=#fefefe
| 70126 ||  || — || July 13, 1999 || Socorro || LINEAR || — || align=right | 3.2 km || 
|-id=127 bgcolor=#fefefe
| 70127 ||  || — || July 13, 1999 || Socorro || LINEAR || — || align=right | 2.2 km || 
|-id=128 bgcolor=#E9E9E9
| 70128 ||  || — || July 13, 1999 || Socorro || LINEAR || — || align=right | 2.0 km || 
|-id=129 bgcolor=#fefefe
| 70129 ||  || — || July 13, 1999 || Socorro || LINEAR || NYS || align=right | 1.3 km || 
|-id=130 bgcolor=#fefefe
| 70130 ||  || — || July 13, 1999 || Socorro || LINEAR || NYS || align=right | 3.3 km || 
|-id=131 bgcolor=#fefefe
| 70131 ||  || — || July 13, 1999 || Socorro || LINEAR || NYS || align=right | 1.6 km || 
|-id=132 bgcolor=#fefefe
| 70132 ||  || — || July 13, 1999 || Socorro || LINEAR || MAS || align=right | 2.0 km || 
|-id=133 bgcolor=#fefefe
| 70133 ||  || — || July 13, 1999 || Socorro || LINEAR || — || align=right | 5.0 km || 
|-id=134 bgcolor=#fefefe
| 70134 ||  || — || July 13, 1999 || Socorro || LINEAR || V || align=right | 1.9 km || 
|-id=135 bgcolor=#fefefe
| 70135 ||  || — || July 13, 1999 || Socorro || LINEAR || — || align=right | 1.8 km || 
|-id=136 bgcolor=#fefefe
| 70136 ||  || — || July 13, 1999 || Socorro || LINEAR || — || align=right | 5.4 km || 
|-id=137 bgcolor=#fefefe
| 70137 ||  || — || July 13, 1999 || Socorro || LINEAR || V || align=right | 2.0 km || 
|-id=138 bgcolor=#fefefe
| 70138 ||  || — || July 13, 1999 || Socorro || LINEAR || V || align=right | 2.3 km || 
|-id=139 bgcolor=#fefefe
| 70139 ||  || — || July 13, 1999 || Socorro || LINEAR || — || align=right | 4.7 km || 
|-id=140 bgcolor=#fefefe
| 70140 ||  || — || July 14, 1999 || Socorro || LINEAR || — || align=right | 2.0 km || 
|-id=141 bgcolor=#fefefe
| 70141 ||  || — || July 14, 1999 || Socorro || LINEAR || — || align=right | 4.5 km || 
|-id=142 bgcolor=#fefefe
| 70142 ||  || — || July 14, 1999 || Socorro || LINEAR || NYS || align=right | 1.4 km || 
|-id=143 bgcolor=#fefefe
| 70143 ||  || — || July 14, 1999 || Socorro || LINEAR || NYS || align=right | 1.9 km || 
|-id=144 bgcolor=#fefefe
| 70144 ||  || — || July 14, 1999 || Socorro || LINEAR || — || align=right | 1.6 km || 
|-id=145 bgcolor=#fefefe
| 70145 ||  || — || July 14, 1999 || Socorro || LINEAR || — || align=right | 2.5 km || 
|-id=146 bgcolor=#fefefe
| 70146 ||  || — || July 14, 1999 || Socorro || LINEAR || — || align=right | 1.8 km || 
|-id=147 bgcolor=#fefefe
| 70147 ||  || — || July 14, 1999 || Socorro || LINEAR || NYS || align=right | 1.8 km || 
|-id=148 bgcolor=#fefefe
| 70148 ||  || — || July 14, 1999 || Socorro || LINEAR || NYS || align=right | 1.5 km || 
|-id=149 bgcolor=#d6d6d6
| 70149 ||  || — || July 14, 1999 || Socorro || LINEAR || — || align=right | 6.1 km || 
|-id=150 bgcolor=#fefefe
| 70150 ||  || — || July 14, 1999 || Socorro || LINEAR || — || align=right | 1.6 km || 
|-id=151 bgcolor=#fefefe
| 70151 ||  || — || July 14, 1999 || Socorro || LINEAR || NYS || align=right | 5.2 km || 
|-id=152 bgcolor=#fefefe
| 70152 ||  || — || July 14, 1999 || Socorro || LINEAR || V || align=right | 2.1 km || 
|-id=153 bgcolor=#fefefe
| 70153 ||  || — || July 14, 1999 || Socorro || LINEAR || — || align=right | 1.7 km || 
|-id=154 bgcolor=#fefefe
| 70154 ||  || — || July 14, 1999 || Socorro || LINEAR || NYS || align=right | 1.4 km || 
|-id=155 bgcolor=#fefefe
| 70155 ||  || — || July 14, 1999 || Socorro || LINEAR || — || align=right | 4.9 km || 
|-id=156 bgcolor=#fefefe
| 70156 ||  || — || July 14, 1999 || Socorro || LINEAR || — || align=right | 2.3 km || 
|-id=157 bgcolor=#fefefe
| 70157 ||  || — || July 14, 1999 || Socorro || LINEAR || V || align=right | 2.2 km || 
|-id=158 bgcolor=#fefefe
| 70158 ||  || — || July 14, 1999 || Socorro || LINEAR || KLI || align=right | 4.9 km || 
|-id=159 bgcolor=#fefefe
| 70159 ||  || — || July 14, 1999 || Socorro || LINEAR || V || align=right | 1.8 km || 
|-id=160 bgcolor=#fefefe
| 70160 ||  || — || July 13, 1999 || Socorro || LINEAR || — || align=right | 2.3 km || 
|-id=161 bgcolor=#fefefe
| 70161 ||  || — || July 13, 1999 || Socorro || LINEAR || — || align=right | 1.6 km || 
|-id=162 bgcolor=#fefefe
| 70162 ||  || — || July 13, 1999 || Socorro || LINEAR || FLO || align=right | 2.4 km || 
|-id=163 bgcolor=#fefefe
| 70163 ||  || — || July 13, 1999 || Socorro || LINEAR || — || align=right | 2.3 km || 
|-id=164 bgcolor=#fefefe
| 70164 ||  || — || July 13, 1999 || Socorro || LINEAR || — || align=right | 1.5 km || 
|-id=165 bgcolor=#fefefe
| 70165 ||  || — || July 13, 1999 || Socorro || LINEAR || — || align=right | 2.3 km || 
|-id=166 bgcolor=#fefefe
| 70166 ||  || — || July 14, 1999 || Socorro || LINEAR || FLO || align=right | 2.4 km || 
|-id=167 bgcolor=#E9E9E9
| 70167 ||  || — || July 12, 1999 || Socorro || LINEAR || MIT || align=right | 5.2 km || 
|-id=168 bgcolor=#fefefe
| 70168 ||  || — || July 13, 1999 || Socorro || LINEAR || — || align=right | 2.4 km || 
|-id=169 bgcolor=#fefefe
| 70169 ||  || — || July 14, 1999 || Socorro || LINEAR || NYS || align=right | 3.4 km || 
|-id=170 bgcolor=#fefefe
| 70170 ||  || — || July 18, 1999 || Reedy Creek || J. Broughton || NYS || align=right | 1.6 km || 
|-id=171 bgcolor=#fefefe
| 70171 ||  || — || July 22, 1999 || Socorro || LINEAR || PHO || align=right | 4.0 km || 
|-id=172 bgcolor=#fefefe
| 70172 ||  || — || July 16, 1999 || Socorro || LINEAR || — || align=right | 2.2 km || 
|-id=173 bgcolor=#fefefe
| 70173 ||  || — || July 16, 1999 || Socorro || LINEAR || NYS || align=right | 1.6 km || 
|-id=174 bgcolor=#fefefe
| 70174 ||  || — || August 11, 1999 || Reedy Creek || J. Broughton || — || align=right | 1.7 km || 
|-id=175 bgcolor=#fefefe
| 70175 ||  || — || August 15, 1999 || Reedy Creek || J. Broughton || FLO || align=right | 2.1 km || 
|-id=176 bgcolor=#fefefe
| 70176 ||  || — || August 7, 1999 || Anderson Mesa || LONEOS || NYS || align=right | 1.3 km || 
|-id=177 bgcolor=#fefefe
| 70177 ||  || — || August 7, 1999 || Anderson Mesa || LONEOS || NYS || align=right | 1.7 km || 
|-id=178 bgcolor=#fefefe
| 70178 || 1999 QC || — || August 17, 1999 || Farra d'Isonzo || Farra d'Isonzo || — || align=right | 3.8 km || 
|-id=179 bgcolor=#E9E9E9
| 70179 Beppechiara ||  ||  || August 21, 1999 || Gnosca || S. Sposetti || — || align=right | 2.0 km || 
|-id=180 bgcolor=#fefefe
| 70180 ||  || — || August 31, 1999 || Ondřejov || L. Kotková || — || align=right | 2.5 km || 
|-id=181 bgcolor=#fefefe
| 70181 ||  || — || September 4, 1999 || Catalina || CSS || V || align=right | 2.6 km || 
|-id=182 bgcolor=#fefefe
| 70182 ||  || — || September 5, 1999 || Višnjan Observatory || K. Korlević || — || align=right | 2.7 km || 
|-id=183 bgcolor=#fefefe
| 70183 ||  || — || September 6, 1999 || Višnjan Observatory || K. Korlević || NYS || align=right | 4.9 km || 
|-id=184 bgcolor=#fefefe
| 70184 ||  || — || September 4, 1999 || Catalina || CSS || — || align=right | 3.4 km || 
|-id=185 bgcolor=#fefefe
| 70185 ||  || — || September 4, 1999 || Kitt Peak || Spacewatch || — || align=right | 2.0 km || 
|-id=186 bgcolor=#fefefe
| 70186 ||  || — || September 7, 1999 || Socorro || LINEAR || V || align=right | 2.2 km || 
|-id=187 bgcolor=#fefefe
| 70187 ||  || — || September 7, 1999 || Socorro || LINEAR || FLO || align=right | 3.3 km || 
|-id=188 bgcolor=#fefefe
| 70188 ||  || — || September 7, 1999 || Socorro || LINEAR || MAS || align=right | 1.9 km || 
|-id=189 bgcolor=#fefefe
| 70189 ||  || — || September 7, 1999 || Socorro || LINEAR || — || align=right | 4.4 km || 
|-id=190 bgcolor=#fefefe
| 70190 ||  || — || September 7, 1999 || Socorro || LINEAR || — || align=right | 3.4 km || 
|-id=191 bgcolor=#fefefe
| 70191 ||  || — || September 7, 1999 || Socorro || LINEAR || NYS || align=right | 1.6 km || 
|-id=192 bgcolor=#fefefe
| 70192 ||  || — || September 7, 1999 || Socorro || LINEAR || NYS || align=right | 1.5 km || 
|-id=193 bgcolor=#fefefe
| 70193 ||  || — || September 7, 1999 || Socorro || LINEAR || NYS || align=right | 1.6 km || 
|-id=194 bgcolor=#fefefe
| 70194 ||  || — || September 7, 1999 || Socorro || LINEAR || NYS || align=right | 1.6 km || 
|-id=195 bgcolor=#fefefe
| 70195 ||  || — || September 7, 1999 || Socorro || LINEAR || NYS || align=right | 1.6 km || 
|-id=196 bgcolor=#fefefe
| 70196 ||  || — || September 7, 1999 || Socorro || LINEAR || — || align=right | 1.5 km || 
|-id=197 bgcolor=#fefefe
| 70197 ||  || — || September 7, 1999 || Socorro || LINEAR || CIM || align=right | 4.0 km || 
|-id=198 bgcolor=#E9E9E9
| 70198 ||  || — || September 7, 1999 || Socorro || LINEAR || — || align=right | 1.8 km || 
|-id=199 bgcolor=#fefefe
| 70199 ||  || — || September 7, 1999 || Socorro || LINEAR || — || align=right | 2.9 km || 
|-id=200 bgcolor=#E9E9E9
| 70200 ||  || — || September 7, 1999 || Socorro || LINEAR || — || align=right | 2.3 km || 
|}

70201–70300 

|-bgcolor=#fefefe
| 70201 ||  || — || September 7, 1999 || Socorro || LINEAR || — || align=right | 3.0 km || 
|-id=202 bgcolor=#fefefe
| 70202 ||  || — || September 7, 1999 || Socorro || LINEAR || — || align=right | 3.9 km || 
|-id=203 bgcolor=#fefefe
| 70203 ||  || — || September 7, 1999 || Socorro || LINEAR || NYS || align=right | 6.1 km || 
|-id=204 bgcolor=#fefefe
| 70204 ||  || — || September 7, 1999 || Socorro || LINEAR || NYS || align=right | 2.1 km || 
|-id=205 bgcolor=#E9E9E9
| 70205 ||  || — || September 7, 1999 || Socorro || LINEAR || — || align=right | 4.7 km || 
|-id=206 bgcolor=#fefefe
| 70206 ||  || — || September 5, 1999 || Bergisch Gladbach || W. Bickel || MAS || align=right | 1.8 km || 
|-id=207 bgcolor=#fefefe
| 70207 Davidunlap ||  ||  || September 4, 1999 || OCA-Anza || M. Collins, M. White || V || align=right | 2.4 km || 
|-id=208 bgcolor=#fefefe
| 70208 ||  || — || September 10, 1999 || Socorro || LINEAR || PHO || align=right | 1.7 km || 
|-id=209 bgcolor=#E9E9E9
| 70209 ||  || — || September 10, 1999 || Višnjan Observatory || K. Korlević || — || align=right | 8.7 km || 
|-id=210 bgcolor=#fefefe
| 70210 Cesarelombardi ||  ||  || September 11, 1999 || Bologna || San Vittore Obs. || NYS || align=right | 1.3 km || 
|-id=211 bgcolor=#E9E9E9
| 70211 ||  || — || September 12, 1999 || Višnjan Observatory || K. Korlević || — || align=right | 2.3 km || 
|-id=212 bgcolor=#fefefe
| 70212 ||  || — || September 12, 1999 || Višnjan Observatory || K. Korlević || NYS || align=right | 5.9 km || 
|-id=213 bgcolor=#E9E9E9
| 70213 ||  || — || September 12, 1999 || Catalina || CSS || — || align=right | 2.6 km || 
|-id=214 bgcolor=#E9E9E9
| 70214 ||  || — || September 7, 1999 || Socorro || LINEAR || — || align=right | 3.9 km || 
|-id=215 bgcolor=#fefefe
| 70215 ||  || — || September 7, 1999 || Socorro || LINEAR || PHO || align=right | 3.4 km || 
|-id=216 bgcolor=#d6d6d6
| 70216 ||  || — || September 14, 1999 || Ondřejov || P. Kušnirák, P. Pravec || — || align=right | 7.1 km || 
|-id=217 bgcolor=#E9E9E9
| 70217 ||  || — || September 14, 1999 || Višnjan Observatory || K. Korlević || — || align=right | 3.5 km || 
|-id=218 bgcolor=#E9E9E9
| 70218 ||  || — || September 13, 1999 || Črni Vrh || Črni Vrh || EUN || align=right | 2.5 km || 
|-id=219 bgcolor=#E9E9E9
| 70219 ||  || — || September 15, 1999 || Višnjan Observatory || K. Korlević || — || align=right | 4.4 km || 
|-id=220 bgcolor=#E9E9E9
| 70220 ||  || — || September 13, 1999 || Woomera || F. B. Zoltowski || MAR || align=right | 2.0 km || 
|-id=221 bgcolor=#fefefe
| 70221 ||  || — || September 11, 1999 || Saint-Michel-sur-Meurthe || L. Bernasconi || NYS || align=right | 3.3 km || 
|-id=222 bgcolor=#E9E9E9
| 70222 ||  || — || September 7, 1999 || Socorro || LINEAR || — || align=right | 3.0 km || 
|-id=223 bgcolor=#fefefe
| 70223 ||  || — || September 7, 1999 || Socorro || LINEAR || — || align=right | 1.6 km || 
|-id=224 bgcolor=#fefefe
| 70224 ||  || — || September 7, 1999 || Socorro || LINEAR || — || align=right | 2.0 km || 
|-id=225 bgcolor=#fefefe
| 70225 ||  || — || September 7, 1999 || Socorro || LINEAR || NYS || align=right | 1.6 km || 
|-id=226 bgcolor=#fefefe
| 70226 ||  || — || September 7, 1999 || Socorro || LINEAR || — || align=right | 3.0 km || 
|-id=227 bgcolor=#fefefe
| 70227 ||  || — || September 7, 1999 || Socorro || LINEAR || — || align=right | 4.5 km || 
|-id=228 bgcolor=#fefefe
| 70228 ||  || — || September 7, 1999 || Socorro || LINEAR || MAS || align=right | 2.1 km || 
|-id=229 bgcolor=#E9E9E9
| 70229 ||  || — || September 7, 1999 || Socorro || LINEAR || — || align=right | 2.2 km || 
|-id=230 bgcolor=#fefefe
| 70230 ||  || — || September 7, 1999 || Socorro || LINEAR || NYS || align=right | 1.7 km || 
|-id=231 bgcolor=#fefefe
| 70231 ||  || — || September 7, 1999 || Socorro || LINEAR || V || align=right | 1.9 km || 
|-id=232 bgcolor=#E9E9E9
| 70232 ||  || — || September 7, 1999 || Socorro || LINEAR || — || align=right | 4.7 km || 
|-id=233 bgcolor=#fefefe
| 70233 ||  || — || September 7, 1999 || Socorro || LINEAR || — || align=right | 1.9 km || 
|-id=234 bgcolor=#fefefe
| 70234 ||  || — || September 7, 1999 || Socorro || LINEAR || FLO || align=right | 1.7 km || 
|-id=235 bgcolor=#fefefe
| 70235 ||  || — || September 7, 1999 || Socorro || LINEAR || NYS || align=right | 1.6 km || 
|-id=236 bgcolor=#fefefe
| 70236 ||  || — || September 7, 1999 || Socorro || LINEAR || NYS || align=right | 2.2 km || 
|-id=237 bgcolor=#fefefe
| 70237 ||  || — || September 7, 1999 || Socorro || LINEAR || NYS || align=right | 1.2 km || 
|-id=238 bgcolor=#fefefe
| 70238 ||  || — || September 7, 1999 || Socorro || LINEAR || NYS || align=right | 2.6 km || 
|-id=239 bgcolor=#E9E9E9
| 70239 ||  || — || September 7, 1999 || Socorro || LINEAR || — || align=right | 2.0 km || 
|-id=240 bgcolor=#fefefe
| 70240 ||  || — || September 7, 1999 || Socorro || LINEAR || MAS || align=right | 1.7 km || 
|-id=241 bgcolor=#fefefe
| 70241 ||  || — || September 7, 1999 || Socorro || LINEAR || ERI || align=right | 4.3 km || 
|-id=242 bgcolor=#fefefe
| 70242 ||  || — || September 7, 1999 || Socorro || LINEAR || — || align=right | 2.3 km || 
|-id=243 bgcolor=#fefefe
| 70243 ||  || — || September 7, 1999 || Socorro || LINEAR || MAS || align=right | 1.6 km || 
|-id=244 bgcolor=#fefefe
| 70244 ||  || — || September 7, 1999 || Socorro || LINEAR || — || align=right | 1.8 km || 
|-id=245 bgcolor=#fefefe
| 70245 ||  || — || September 7, 1999 || Socorro || LINEAR || — || align=right | 2.5 km || 
|-id=246 bgcolor=#fefefe
| 70246 ||  || — || September 7, 1999 || Socorro || LINEAR || — || align=right | 3.6 km || 
|-id=247 bgcolor=#E9E9E9
| 70247 ||  || — || September 7, 1999 || Socorro || LINEAR || — || align=right | 1.9 km || 
|-id=248 bgcolor=#fefefe
| 70248 ||  || — || September 7, 1999 || Socorro || LINEAR || V || align=right | 1.6 km || 
|-id=249 bgcolor=#fefefe
| 70249 ||  || — || September 7, 1999 || Socorro || LINEAR || NYS || align=right | 1.7 km || 
|-id=250 bgcolor=#E9E9E9
| 70250 ||  || — || September 7, 1999 || Socorro || LINEAR || — || align=right | 2.0 km || 
|-id=251 bgcolor=#fefefe
| 70251 ||  || — || September 7, 1999 || Socorro || LINEAR || V || align=right | 1.9 km || 
|-id=252 bgcolor=#fefefe
| 70252 ||  || — || September 7, 1999 || Socorro || LINEAR || — || align=right | 2.8 km || 
|-id=253 bgcolor=#fefefe
| 70253 ||  || — || September 7, 1999 || Socorro || LINEAR || V || align=right | 2.8 km || 
|-id=254 bgcolor=#E9E9E9
| 70254 ||  || — || September 7, 1999 || Socorro || LINEAR || — || align=right | 3.3 km || 
|-id=255 bgcolor=#E9E9E9
| 70255 ||  || — || September 7, 1999 || Socorro || LINEAR || — || align=right | 2.3 km || 
|-id=256 bgcolor=#fefefe
| 70256 ||  || — || September 7, 1999 || Socorro || LINEAR || NYS || align=right | 2.4 km || 
|-id=257 bgcolor=#fefefe
| 70257 ||  || — || September 7, 1999 || Socorro || LINEAR || — || align=right | 1.6 km || 
|-id=258 bgcolor=#fefefe
| 70258 ||  || — || September 7, 1999 || Socorro || LINEAR || NYS || align=right | 2.6 km || 
|-id=259 bgcolor=#fefefe
| 70259 ||  || — || September 7, 1999 || Socorro || LINEAR || — || align=right | 1.6 km || 
|-id=260 bgcolor=#fefefe
| 70260 ||  || — || September 7, 1999 || Socorro || LINEAR || — || align=right | 2.5 km || 
|-id=261 bgcolor=#fefefe
| 70261 ||  || — || September 7, 1999 || Socorro || LINEAR || — || align=right | 3.0 km || 
|-id=262 bgcolor=#fefefe
| 70262 ||  || — || September 7, 1999 || Socorro || LINEAR || — || align=right | 2.8 km || 
|-id=263 bgcolor=#E9E9E9
| 70263 ||  || — || September 7, 1999 || Socorro || LINEAR || — || align=right | 2.7 km || 
|-id=264 bgcolor=#fefefe
| 70264 ||  || — || September 7, 1999 || Socorro || LINEAR || NYS || align=right | 3.9 km || 
|-id=265 bgcolor=#fefefe
| 70265 ||  || — || September 7, 1999 || Socorro || LINEAR || — || align=right | 3.0 km || 
|-id=266 bgcolor=#fefefe
| 70266 ||  || — || September 7, 1999 || Socorro || LINEAR || — || align=right | 3.1 km || 
|-id=267 bgcolor=#fefefe
| 70267 ||  || — || September 7, 1999 || Socorro || LINEAR || V || align=right | 1.9 km || 
|-id=268 bgcolor=#fefefe
| 70268 ||  || — || September 7, 1999 || Socorro || LINEAR || NYS || align=right | 1.7 km || 
|-id=269 bgcolor=#fefefe
| 70269 ||  || — || September 7, 1999 || Socorro || LINEAR || — || align=right | 2.0 km || 
|-id=270 bgcolor=#fefefe
| 70270 ||  || — || September 8, 1999 || Socorro || LINEAR || — || align=right | 2.5 km || 
|-id=271 bgcolor=#fefefe
| 70271 ||  || — || September 8, 1999 || Socorro || LINEAR || V || align=right | 2.6 km || 
|-id=272 bgcolor=#fefefe
| 70272 ||  || — || September 8, 1999 || Socorro || LINEAR || NYS || align=right | 1.9 km || 
|-id=273 bgcolor=#E9E9E9
| 70273 ||  || — || September 8, 1999 || Socorro || LINEAR || — || align=right | 3.2 km || 
|-id=274 bgcolor=#fefefe
| 70274 ||  || — || September 8, 1999 || Socorro || LINEAR || — || align=right | 2.0 km || 
|-id=275 bgcolor=#fefefe
| 70275 ||  || — || September 8, 1999 || Socorro || LINEAR || — || align=right | 2.4 km || 
|-id=276 bgcolor=#E9E9E9
| 70276 ||  || — || September 8, 1999 || Socorro || LINEAR || ADE || align=right | 4.1 km || 
|-id=277 bgcolor=#fefefe
| 70277 ||  || — || September 8, 1999 || Socorro || LINEAR || V || align=right | 2.6 km || 
|-id=278 bgcolor=#E9E9E9
| 70278 ||  || — || September 8, 1999 || Socorro || LINEAR || — || align=right | 7.8 km || 
|-id=279 bgcolor=#E9E9E9
| 70279 ||  || — || September 8, 1999 || Socorro || LINEAR || — || align=right | 3.5 km || 
|-id=280 bgcolor=#E9E9E9
| 70280 ||  || — || September 8, 1999 || Socorro || LINEAR || BRU || align=right | 6.9 km || 
|-id=281 bgcolor=#fefefe
| 70281 ||  || — || September 8, 1999 || Socorro || LINEAR || KLI || align=right | 6.2 km || 
|-id=282 bgcolor=#fefefe
| 70282 ||  || — || September 9, 1999 || Socorro || LINEAR || — || align=right | 6.1 km || 
|-id=283 bgcolor=#fefefe
| 70283 ||  || — || September 9, 1999 || Socorro || LINEAR || — || align=right | 2.2 km || 
|-id=284 bgcolor=#fefefe
| 70284 ||  || — || September 9, 1999 || Socorro || LINEAR || MAS || align=right | 2.4 km || 
|-id=285 bgcolor=#fefefe
| 70285 ||  || — || September 9, 1999 || Socorro || LINEAR || — || align=right | 1.7 km || 
|-id=286 bgcolor=#fefefe
| 70286 ||  || — || September 9, 1999 || Socorro || LINEAR || V || align=right | 1.6 km || 
|-id=287 bgcolor=#fefefe
| 70287 ||  || — || September 9, 1999 || Socorro || LINEAR || NYS || align=right | 1.5 km || 
|-id=288 bgcolor=#fefefe
| 70288 ||  || — || September 9, 1999 || Socorro || LINEAR || V || align=right | 1.9 km || 
|-id=289 bgcolor=#fefefe
| 70289 ||  || — || September 9, 1999 || Socorro || LINEAR || — || align=right | 2.0 km || 
|-id=290 bgcolor=#fefefe
| 70290 ||  || — || September 9, 1999 || Socorro || LINEAR || — || align=right | 2.9 km || 
|-id=291 bgcolor=#fefefe
| 70291 ||  || — || September 9, 1999 || Socorro || LINEAR || — || align=right | 2.2 km || 
|-id=292 bgcolor=#fefefe
| 70292 ||  || — || September 9, 1999 || Socorro || LINEAR || V || align=right | 2.2 km || 
|-id=293 bgcolor=#fefefe
| 70293 ||  || — || September 9, 1999 || Socorro || LINEAR || — || align=right | 1.9 km || 
|-id=294 bgcolor=#fefefe
| 70294 ||  || — || September 9, 1999 || Socorro || LINEAR || V || align=right | 2.1 km || 
|-id=295 bgcolor=#fefefe
| 70295 ||  || — || September 9, 1999 || Socorro || LINEAR || — || align=right | 3.5 km || 
|-id=296 bgcolor=#fefefe
| 70296 ||  || — || September 9, 1999 || Socorro || LINEAR || FLO || align=right | 2.6 km || 
|-id=297 bgcolor=#fefefe
| 70297 ||  || — || September 9, 1999 || Socorro || LINEAR || NYS || align=right | 1.7 km || 
|-id=298 bgcolor=#fefefe
| 70298 ||  || — || September 9, 1999 || Socorro || LINEAR || NYS || align=right | 1.3 km || 
|-id=299 bgcolor=#fefefe
| 70299 ||  || — || September 9, 1999 || Socorro || LINEAR || — || align=right | 5.0 km || 
|-id=300 bgcolor=#fefefe
| 70300 ||  || — || September 9, 1999 || Socorro || LINEAR || — || align=right | 2.1 km || 
|}

70301–70400 

|-bgcolor=#fefefe
| 70301 ||  || — || September 9, 1999 || Socorro || LINEAR || V || align=right | 2.2 km || 
|-id=302 bgcolor=#fefefe
| 70302 ||  || — || September 9, 1999 || Socorro || LINEAR || V || align=right | 1.9 km || 
|-id=303 bgcolor=#fefefe
| 70303 ||  || — || September 9, 1999 || Socorro || LINEAR || V || align=right | 1.8 km || 
|-id=304 bgcolor=#fefefe
| 70304 ||  || — || September 9, 1999 || Socorro || LINEAR || — || align=right | 2.1 km || 
|-id=305 bgcolor=#fefefe
| 70305 ||  || — || September 9, 1999 || Socorro || LINEAR || — || align=right | 2.2 km || 
|-id=306 bgcolor=#fefefe
| 70306 ||  || — || September 9, 1999 || Socorro || LINEAR || — || align=right | 2.3 km || 
|-id=307 bgcolor=#fefefe
| 70307 ||  || — || September 9, 1999 || Socorro || LINEAR || NYS || align=right | 1.9 km || 
|-id=308 bgcolor=#E9E9E9
| 70308 ||  || — || September 9, 1999 || Socorro || LINEAR || EUN || align=right | 3.1 km || 
|-id=309 bgcolor=#fefefe
| 70309 ||  || — || September 9, 1999 || Socorro || LINEAR || V || align=right | 1.8 km || 
|-id=310 bgcolor=#fefefe
| 70310 ||  || — || September 9, 1999 || Socorro || LINEAR || V || align=right | 1.9 km || 
|-id=311 bgcolor=#fefefe
| 70311 ||  || — || September 9, 1999 || Socorro || LINEAR || — || align=right | 3.1 km || 
|-id=312 bgcolor=#fefefe
| 70312 ||  || — || September 9, 1999 || Socorro || LINEAR || — || align=right | 5.0 km || 
|-id=313 bgcolor=#fefefe
| 70313 ||  || — || September 9, 1999 || Socorro || LINEAR || NYS || align=right | 4.1 km || 
|-id=314 bgcolor=#fefefe
| 70314 ||  || — || September 9, 1999 || Socorro || LINEAR || — || align=right | 3.0 km || 
|-id=315 bgcolor=#fefefe
| 70315 ||  || — || September 9, 1999 || Socorro || LINEAR || NYS || align=right | 1.9 km || 
|-id=316 bgcolor=#fefefe
| 70316 ||  || — || September 9, 1999 || Socorro || LINEAR || EUT || align=right | 1.2 km || 
|-id=317 bgcolor=#fefefe
| 70317 ||  || — || September 9, 1999 || Socorro || LINEAR || — || align=right | 1.8 km || 
|-id=318 bgcolor=#fefefe
| 70318 ||  || — || September 9, 1999 || Socorro || LINEAR || V || align=right | 1.7 km || 
|-id=319 bgcolor=#fefefe
| 70319 ||  || — || September 9, 1999 || Socorro || LINEAR || — || align=right | 2.4 km || 
|-id=320 bgcolor=#fefefe
| 70320 ||  || — || September 9, 1999 || Socorro || LINEAR || — || align=right | 3.3 km || 
|-id=321 bgcolor=#fefefe
| 70321 ||  || — || September 9, 1999 || Socorro || LINEAR || — || align=right | 1.6 km || 
|-id=322 bgcolor=#fefefe
| 70322 ||  || — || September 9, 1999 || Socorro || LINEAR || MAS || align=right | 1.6 km || 
|-id=323 bgcolor=#fefefe
| 70323 ||  || — || September 9, 1999 || Socorro || LINEAR || — || align=right | 2.0 km || 
|-id=324 bgcolor=#fefefe
| 70324 ||  || — || September 14, 1999 || Kitt Peak || Spacewatch || V || align=right | 1.3 km || 
|-id=325 bgcolor=#fefefe
| 70325 ||  || — || September 9, 1999 || Socorro || LINEAR || NYS || align=right | 1.3 km || 
|-id=326 bgcolor=#fefefe
| 70326 ||  || — || September 9, 1999 || Socorro || LINEAR || — || align=right | 1.8 km || 
|-id=327 bgcolor=#fefefe
| 70327 ||  || — || September 9, 1999 || Socorro || LINEAR || NYS || align=right | 2.2 km || 
|-id=328 bgcolor=#fefefe
| 70328 ||  || — || September 9, 1999 || Socorro || LINEAR || — || align=right | 2.2 km || 
|-id=329 bgcolor=#fefefe
| 70329 ||  || — || September 9, 1999 || Socorro || LINEAR || NYS || align=right | 1.8 km || 
|-id=330 bgcolor=#fefefe
| 70330 ||  || — || September 9, 1999 || Socorro || LINEAR || NYS || align=right | 2.1 km || 
|-id=331 bgcolor=#E9E9E9
| 70331 ||  || — || September 9, 1999 || Socorro || LINEAR || — || align=right | 1.4 km || 
|-id=332 bgcolor=#fefefe
| 70332 ||  || — || September 9, 1999 || Socorro || LINEAR || — || align=right | 2.6 km || 
|-id=333 bgcolor=#fefefe
| 70333 ||  || — || September 9, 1999 || Socorro || LINEAR || FLO || align=right | 2.7 km || 
|-id=334 bgcolor=#fefefe
| 70334 ||  || — || September 9, 1999 || Socorro || LINEAR || NYS || align=right | 1.9 km || 
|-id=335 bgcolor=#fefefe
| 70335 ||  || — || September 9, 1999 || Socorro || LINEAR || NYS || align=right | 1.9 km || 
|-id=336 bgcolor=#fefefe
| 70336 ||  || — || September 9, 1999 || Socorro || LINEAR || V || align=right | 2.0 km || 
|-id=337 bgcolor=#fefefe
| 70337 ||  || — || September 9, 1999 || Socorro || LINEAR || — || align=right | 2.4 km || 
|-id=338 bgcolor=#E9E9E9
| 70338 ||  || — || September 9, 1999 || Socorro || LINEAR || — || align=right | 2.7 km || 
|-id=339 bgcolor=#fefefe
| 70339 ||  || — || September 9, 1999 || Socorro || LINEAR || — || align=right | 6.0 km || 
|-id=340 bgcolor=#fefefe
| 70340 ||  || — || September 9, 1999 || Socorro || LINEAR || — || align=right | 1.5 km || 
|-id=341 bgcolor=#E9E9E9
| 70341 ||  || — || September 9, 1999 || Socorro || LINEAR || — || align=right | 2.7 km || 
|-id=342 bgcolor=#fefefe
| 70342 ||  || — || September 9, 1999 || Socorro || LINEAR || NYS || align=right | 1.4 km || 
|-id=343 bgcolor=#fefefe
| 70343 ||  || — || September 9, 1999 || Socorro || LINEAR || — || align=right | 1.9 km || 
|-id=344 bgcolor=#E9E9E9
| 70344 ||  || — || September 9, 1999 || Socorro || LINEAR || — || align=right | 2.1 km || 
|-id=345 bgcolor=#fefefe
| 70345 ||  || — || September 9, 1999 || Socorro || LINEAR || — || align=right | 2.5 km || 
|-id=346 bgcolor=#fefefe
| 70346 ||  || — || September 9, 1999 || Socorro || LINEAR || FLO || align=right | 1.7 km || 
|-id=347 bgcolor=#E9E9E9
| 70347 ||  || — || September 9, 1999 || Socorro || LINEAR || — || align=right | 2.6 km || 
|-id=348 bgcolor=#E9E9E9
| 70348 ||  || — || September 9, 1999 || Socorro || LINEAR || — || align=right | 3.8 km || 
|-id=349 bgcolor=#fefefe
| 70349 ||  || — || September 9, 1999 || Socorro || LINEAR || NYS || align=right | 1.8 km || 
|-id=350 bgcolor=#fefefe
| 70350 ||  || — || September 9, 1999 || Socorro || LINEAR || — || align=right | 6.9 km || 
|-id=351 bgcolor=#fefefe
| 70351 ||  || — || September 9, 1999 || Socorro || LINEAR || NYS || align=right | 1.6 km || 
|-id=352 bgcolor=#fefefe
| 70352 ||  || — || September 9, 1999 || Socorro || LINEAR || NYS || align=right | 1.9 km || 
|-id=353 bgcolor=#fefefe
| 70353 ||  || — || September 9, 1999 || Socorro || LINEAR || — || align=right | 1.8 km || 
|-id=354 bgcolor=#fefefe
| 70354 ||  || — || September 9, 1999 || Socorro || LINEAR || V || align=right | 2.4 km || 
|-id=355 bgcolor=#fefefe
| 70355 ||  || — || September 9, 1999 || Socorro || LINEAR || — || align=right | 2.0 km || 
|-id=356 bgcolor=#fefefe
| 70356 ||  || — || September 9, 1999 || Socorro || LINEAR || NYS || align=right | 1.4 km || 
|-id=357 bgcolor=#E9E9E9
| 70357 ||  || — || September 9, 1999 || Socorro || LINEAR || — || align=right | 2.0 km || 
|-id=358 bgcolor=#fefefe
| 70358 ||  || — || September 9, 1999 || Socorro || LINEAR || — || align=right | 1.6 km || 
|-id=359 bgcolor=#E9E9E9
| 70359 ||  || — || September 9, 1999 || Socorro || LINEAR || — || align=right | 1.8 km || 
|-id=360 bgcolor=#E9E9E9
| 70360 ||  || — || September 9, 1999 || Socorro || LINEAR || — || align=right | 2.3 km || 
|-id=361 bgcolor=#fefefe
| 70361 ||  || — || September 9, 1999 || Socorro || LINEAR || ERI || align=right | 5.8 km || 
|-id=362 bgcolor=#E9E9E9
| 70362 ||  || — || September 11, 1999 || Socorro || LINEAR || — || align=right | 2.9 km || 
|-id=363 bgcolor=#fefefe
| 70363 ||  || — || September 13, 1999 || Socorro || LINEAR || — || align=right | 2.8 km || 
|-id=364 bgcolor=#fefefe
| 70364 ||  || — || September 7, 1999 || Socorro || LINEAR || fast? || align=right | 2.0 km || 
|-id=365 bgcolor=#fefefe
| 70365 ||  || — || September 9, 1999 || Socorro || LINEAR || — || align=right | 1.9 km || 
|-id=366 bgcolor=#fefefe
| 70366 ||  || — || September 9, 1999 || Socorro || LINEAR || — || align=right | 4.1 km || 
|-id=367 bgcolor=#fefefe
| 70367 ||  || — || September 8, 1999 || Socorro || LINEAR || — || align=right | 3.4 km || 
|-id=368 bgcolor=#fefefe
| 70368 ||  || — || September 8, 1999 || Socorro || LINEAR || V || align=right | 1.5 km || 
|-id=369 bgcolor=#E9E9E9
| 70369 ||  || — || September 8, 1999 || Socorro || LINEAR || — || align=right | 3.3 km || 
|-id=370 bgcolor=#E9E9E9
| 70370 ||  || — || September 8, 1999 || Socorro || LINEAR || GEF || align=right | 3.9 km || 
|-id=371 bgcolor=#fefefe
| 70371 ||  || — || September 8, 1999 || Socorro || LINEAR || V || align=right | 1.7 km || 
|-id=372 bgcolor=#E9E9E9
| 70372 ||  || — || September 8, 1999 || Socorro || LINEAR || — || align=right | 7.4 km || 
|-id=373 bgcolor=#E9E9E9
| 70373 ||  || — || September 8, 1999 || Socorro || LINEAR || — || align=right | 2.6 km || 
|-id=374 bgcolor=#fefefe
| 70374 ||  || — || September 8, 1999 || Socorro || LINEAR || — || align=right | 5.6 km || 
|-id=375 bgcolor=#fefefe
| 70375 ||  || — || September 8, 1999 || Socorro || LINEAR || — || align=right | 1.7 km || 
|-id=376 bgcolor=#fefefe
| 70376 ||  || — || September 8, 1999 || Socorro || LINEAR || — || align=right | 4.4 km || 
|-id=377 bgcolor=#E9E9E9
| 70377 ||  || — || September 8, 1999 || Socorro || LINEAR || — || align=right | 4.6 km || 
|-id=378 bgcolor=#fefefe
| 70378 ||  || — || September 8, 1999 || Socorro || LINEAR || — || align=right | 4.5 km || 
|-id=379 bgcolor=#fefefe
| 70379 ||  || — || September 8, 1999 || Socorro || LINEAR || — || align=right | 3.6 km || 
|-id=380 bgcolor=#E9E9E9
| 70380 ||  || — || September 8, 1999 || Socorro || LINEAR || EUN || align=right | 5.3 km || 
|-id=381 bgcolor=#fefefe
| 70381 ||  || — || September 13, 1999 || Kitt Peak || Spacewatch || — || align=right | 3.3 km || 
|-id=382 bgcolor=#fefefe
| 70382 ||  || — || September 5, 1999 || Anderson Mesa || LONEOS || — || align=right | 2.4 km || 
|-id=383 bgcolor=#fefefe
| 70383 ||  || — || September 4, 1999 || Catalina || CSS || — || align=right | 2.8 km || 
|-id=384 bgcolor=#fefefe
| 70384 ||  || — || September 4, 1999 || Anderson Mesa || LONEOS || V || align=right | 1.5 km || 
|-id=385 bgcolor=#fefefe
| 70385 ||  || — || September 4, 1999 || Anderson Mesa || LONEOS || — || align=right | 3.7 km || 
|-id=386 bgcolor=#fefefe
| 70386 ||  || — || September 5, 1999 || Catalina || CSS || V || align=right | 1.7 km || 
|-id=387 bgcolor=#fefefe
| 70387 ||  || — || September 6, 1999 || Kitt Peak || Spacewatch || NYS || align=right | 1.4 km || 
|-id=388 bgcolor=#fefefe
| 70388 ||  || — || September 7, 1999 || Anderson Mesa || LONEOS || V || align=right | 2.6 km || 
|-id=389 bgcolor=#fefefe
| 70389 ||  || — || September 4, 1999 || Catalina || CSS || — || align=right | 2.6 km || 
|-id=390 bgcolor=#E9E9E9
| 70390 ||  || — || September 7, 1999 || Kitt Peak || Spacewatch || — || align=right | 2.1 km || 
|-id=391 bgcolor=#E9E9E9
| 70391 ||  || — || September 8, 1999 || Catalina || CSS || — || align=right | 2.2 km || 
|-id=392 bgcolor=#fefefe
| 70392 ||  || — || September 8, 1999 || Catalina || CSS || — || align=right | 2.3 km || 
|-id=393 bgcolor=#fefefe
| 70393 ||  || — || September 8, 1999 || Catalina || CSS || — || align=right | 2.1 km || 
|-id=394 bgcolor=#fefefe
| 70394 ||  || — || September 8, 1999 || Catalina || CSS || KLI || align=right | 5.2 km || 
|-id=395 bgcolor=#E9E9E9
| 70395 ||  || — || September 8, 1999 || Catalina || CSS || — || align=right | 5.0 km || 
|-id=396 bgcolor=#E9E9E9
| 70396 ||  || — || September 8, 1999 || Socorro || LINEAR || MAR || align=right | 3.5 km || 
|-id=397 bgcolor=#E9E9E9
| 70397 ||  || — || September 8, 1999 || Catalina || CSS || — || align=right | 3.2 km || 
|-id=398 bgcolor=#E9E9E9
| 70398 ||  || — || September 11, 1999 || Anderson Mesa || LONEOS || — || align=right | 4.9 km || 
|-id=399 bgcolor=#E9E9E9
| 70399 ||  || — || September 11, 1999 || Anderson Mesa || LONEOS || JUN || align=right | 2.6 km || 
|-id=400 bgcolor=#fefefe
| 70400 ||  || — || September 13, 1999 || Socorro || LINEAR || V || align=right | 1.5 km || 
|}

70401–70500 

|-bgcolor=#E9E9E9
| 70401 Davidbishop ||  ||  || September 13, 1999 || Tenagra || Tenagra Obs. || — || align=right | 2.2 km || 
|-id=402 bgcolor=#E9E9E9
| 70402 ||  || — || September 4, 1999 || Kitt Peak || Spacewatch || — || align=right | 2.3 km || 
|-id=403 bgcolor=#fefefe
| 70403 ||  || — || September 6, 1999 || Kitt Peak || Spacewatch || MAS || align=right | 1.6 km || 
|-id=404 bgcolor=#fefefe
| 70404 ||  || — || September 7, 1999 || Anderson Mesa || LONEOS || — || align=right | 2.0 km || 
|-id=405 bgcolor=#fefefe
| 70405 ||  || — || September 7, 1999 || Kitt Peak || Spacewatch || — || align=right | 1.8 km || 
|-id=406 bgcolor=#fefefe
| 70406 ||  || — || September 8, 1999 || Socorro || LINEAR || V || align=right | 2.2 km || 
|-id=407 bgcolor=#E9E9E9
| 70407 ||  || — || September 18, 1999 || Prescott || P. G. Comba || — || align=right | 2.1 km || 
|-id=408 bgcolor=#fefefe
| 70408 ||  || — || September 16, 1999 || Socorro || LINEAR || — || align=right | 3.2 km || 
|-id=409 bgcolor=#fefefe
| 70409 Srnín ||  ||  || September 21, 1999 || Kleť || M. Tichý || V || align=right | 2.1 km || 
|-id=410 bgcolor=#fefefe
| 70410 ||  || — || September 22, 1999 || Socorro || LINEAR || PHO || align=right | 5.0 km || 
|-id=411 bgcolor=#fefefe
| 70411 ||  || — || September 22, 1999 || Socorro || LINEAR || PHO || align=right | 5.4 km || 
|-id=412 bgcolor=#E9E9E9
| 70412 ||  || — || September 29, 1999 || Višnjan Observatory || K. Korlević || MAR || align=right | 2.2 km || 
|-id=413 bgcolor=#fefefe
| 70413 ||  || — || September 30, 1999 || Socorro || LINEAR || — || align=right | 2.1 km || 
|-id=414 bgcolor=#fefefe
| 70414 ||  || — || September 30, 1999 || Socorro || LINEAR || V || align=right | 2.1 km || 
|-id=415 bgcolor=#E9E9E9
| 70415 ||  || — || September 30, 1999 || Catalina || CSS || — || align=right | 3.4 km || 
|-id=416 bgcolor=#fefefe
| 70416 ||  || — || September 30, 1999 || Catalina || CSS || V || align=right | 2.3 km || 
|-id=417 bgcolor=#E9E9E9
| 70417 ||  || — || September 30, 1999 || Catalina || CSS || — || align=right | 2.4 km || 
|-id=418 bgcolor=#fefefe
| 70418 Kholopov ||  ||  || September 17, 1999 || Monte Agliale || M. M. M. Santangelo || NYS || align=right | 5.2 km || 
|-id=419 bgcolor=#fefefe
| 70419 ||  || — || September 30, 1999 || Socorro || LINEAR || V || align=right | 1.6 km || 
|-id=420 bgcolor=#E9E9E9
| 70420 ||  || — || September 29, 1999 || Catalina || CSS || — || align=right | 2.2 km || 
|-id=421 bgcolor=#fefefe
| 70421 ||  || — || September 29, 1999 || Catalina || CSS || — || align=right | 2.3 km || 
|-id=422 bgcolor=#E9E9E9
| 70422 ||  || — || September 29, 1999 || Catalina || CSS || — || align=right | 3.5 km || 
|-id=423 bgcolor=#fefefe
| 70423 ||  || — || September 30, 1999 || Socorro || LINEAR || V || align=right | 2.4 km || 
|-id=424 bgcolor=#E9E9E9
| 70424 ||  || — || September 30, 1999 || Socorro || LINEAR || — || align=right | 2.5 km || 
|-id=425 bgcolor=#E9E9E9
| 70425 ||  || — || September 30, 1999 || Socorro || LINEAR || fast? || align=right | 2.9 km || 
|-id=426 bgcolor=#fefefe
| 70426 || 1999 TN || — || October 1, 1999 || Zeno || T. Stafford || — || align=right | 1.7 km || 
|-id=427 bgcolor=#fefefe
| 70427 ||  || — || October 1, 1999 || Višnjan Observatory || K. Korlević || ERI || align=right | 5.6 km || 
|-id=428 bgcolor=#fefefe
| 70428 ||  || — || October 1, 1999 || Višnjan Observatory || K. Korlević || NYS || align=right | 1.9 km || 
|-id=429 bgcolor=#E9E9E9
| 70429 ||  || — || October 2, 1999 || Višnjan Observatory || K. Korlević || — || align=right | 4.6 km || 
|-id=430 bgcolor=#E9E9E9
| 70430 ||  || — || October 2, 1999 || Woomera || F. B. Zoltowski || — || align=right | 4.7 km || 
|-id=431 bgcolor=#fefefe
| 70431 ||  || — || October 4, 1999 || Prescott || P. G. Comba || — || align=right | 2.4 km || 
|-id=432 bgcolor=#fefefe
| 70432 ||  || — || October 3, 1999 || Woomera || F. B. Zoltowski || — || align=right | 1.7 km || 
|-id=433 bgcolor=#E9E9E9
| 70433 ||  || — || October 2, 1999 || Ondřejov || L. Kotková || — || align=right | 2.8 km || 
|-id=434 bgcolor=#fefefe
| 70434 ||  || — || October 3, 1999 || Socorro || LINEAR || V || align=right | 2.3 km || 
|-id=435 bgcolor=#E9E9E9
| 70435 ||  || — || October 4, 1999 || Socorro || LINEAR || — || align=right | 4.6 km || 
|-id=436 bgcolor=#fefefe
| 70436 ||  || — || October 6, 1999 || High Point || D. K. Chesney || — || align=right | 5.3 km || 
|-id=437 bgcolor=#E9E9E9
| 70437 ||  || — || October 6, 1999 || Višnjan Observatory || K. Korlević, M. Jurić || — || align=right | 1.8 km || 
|-id=438 bgcolor=#E9E9E9
| 70438 ||  || — || October 6, 1999 || Višnjan Observatory || K. Korlević, M. Jurić || — || align=right | 3.4 km || 
|-id=439 bgcolor=#E9E9E9
| 70439 ||  || — || October 6, 1999 || Višnjan Observatory || K. Korlević, M. Jurić || — || align=right | 5.5 km || 
|-id=440 bgcolor=#fefefe
| 70440 ||  || — || October 2, 1999 || Socorro || LINEAR || — || align=right | 2.5 km || 
|-id=441 bgcolor=#fefefe
| 70441 ||  || — || October 7, 1999 || Fountain Hills || C. W. Juels || ERI || align=right | 3.8 km || 
|-id=442 bgcolor=#fefefe
| 70442 ||  || — || October 8, 1999 || Višnjan Observatory || K. Korlević, M. Jurić || — || align=right | 2.4 km || 
|-id=443 bgcolor=#E9E9E9
| 70443 ||  || — || October 7, 1999 || Črni Vrh || Črni Vrh || HNS || align=right | 2.8 km || 
|-id=444 bgcolor=#E9E9E9
| 70444 Genovali ||  ||  || October 9, 1999 || San Marcello || L. Tesi, M. Tombelli || ADE || align=right | 4.9 km || 
|-id=445 bgcolor=#E9E9E9
| 70445 ||  || — || October 11, 1999 || Črni Vrh || Črni Vrh || — || align=right | 4.0 km || 
|-id=446 bgcolor=#E9E9E9
| 70446 Pugh ||  ||  || October 10, 1999 || Gnosca || S. Sposetti || — || align=right | 3.4 km || 
|-id=447 bgcolor=#fefefe
| 70447 ||  || — || October 10, 1999 || Višnjan Observatory || K. Korlević, M. Jurić || V || align=right | 2.8 km || 
|-id=448 bgcolor=#E9E9E9
| 70448 ||  || — || October 7, 1999 || Ondřejov || P. Kušnirák, L. Kotková || — || align=right | 2.3 km || 
|-id=449 bgcolor=#fefefe
| 70449 Gruebel ||  ||  || October 15, 1999 || SFA Obs. || W. D. Bruton, M. L. Johnson || NYS || align=right | 2.1 km || 
|-id=450 bgcolor=#fefefe
| 70450 ||  || — || October 13, 1999 || Xinglong || SCAP || V || align=right | 2.3 km || 
|-id=451 bgcolor=#E9E9E9
| 70451 ||  || — || October 14, 1999 || Xinglong || SCAP || — || align=right | 2.3 km || 
|-id=452 bgcolor=#E9E9E9
| 70452 ||  || — || October 15, 1999 || Prescott || P. G. Comba || — || align=right | 2.6 km || 
|-id=453 bgcolor=#fefefe
| 70453 ||  || — || October 15, 1999 || Siding Spring || R. H. McNaught || — || align=right | 3.9 km || 
|-id=454 bgcolor=#E9E9E9
| 70454 ||  || — || October 14, 1999 || Xinglong || SCAP || — || align=right | 1.9 km || 
|-id=455 bgcolor=#E9E9E9
| 70455 ||  || — || October 5, 1999 || Goodricke-Pigott || R. A. Tucker || — || align=right | 3.4 km || 
|-id=456 bgcolor=#E9E9E9
| 70456 ||  || — || October 7, 1999 || Goodricke-Pigott || R. A. Tucker || — || align=right | 3.5 km || 
|-id=457 bgcolor=#fefefe
| 70457 ||  || — || October 4, 1999 || Kitt Peak || Spacewatch || V || align=right | 1.3 km || 
|-id=458 bgcolor=#fefefe
| 70458 ||  || — || October 3, 1999 || Socorro || LINEAR || — || align=right | 2.5 km || 
|-id=459 bgcolor=#E9E9E9
| 70459 ||  || — || October 3, 1999 || Socorro || LINEAR || HNS || align=right | 2.8 km || 
|-id=460 bgcolor=#E9E9E9
| 70460 ||  || — || October 3, 1999 || Socorro || LINEAR || — || align=right | 4.6 km || 
|-id=461 bgcolor=#E9E9E9
| 70461 ||  || — || October 3, 1999 || Socorro || LINEAR || — || align=right | 5.3 km || 
|-id=462 bgcolor=#E9E9E9
| 70462 ||  || — || October 3, 1999 || Socorro || LINEAR || — || align=right | 3.6 km || 
|-id=463 bgcolor=#E9E9E9
| 70463 ||  || — || October 4, 1999 || Socorro || LINEAR || — || align=right | 1.8 km || 
|-id=464 bgcolor=#E9E9E9
| 70464 ||  || — || October 4, 1999 || Socorro || LINEAR || — || align=right | 2.3 km || 
|-id=465 bgcolor=#E9E9E9
| 70465 ||  || — || October 4, 1999 || Socorro || LINEAR || — || align=right | 3.3 km || 
|-id=466 bgcolor=#fefefe
| 70466 ||  || — || October 4, 1999 || Socorro || LINEAR || NYS || align=right | 1.6 km || 
|-id=467 bgcolor=#E9E9E9
| 70467 ||  || — || October 4, 1999 || Socorro || LINEAR || — || align=right | 4.4 km || 
|-id=468 bgcolor=#E9E9E9
| 70468 ||  || — || October 4, 1999 || Socorro || LINEAR || — || align=right | 3.3 km || 
|-id=469 bgcolor=#fefefe
| 70469 ||  || — || October 4, 1999 || Socorro || LINEAR || — || align=right | 2.4 km || 
|-id=470 bgcolor=#E9E9E9
| 70470 ||  || — || October 4, 1999 || Socorro || LINEAR || KON || align=right | 4.0 km || 
|-id=471 bgcolor=#E9E9E9
| 70471 ||  || — || October 4, 1999 || Socorro || LINEAR || — || align=right | 4.3 km || 
|-id=472 bgcolor=#E9E9E9
| 70472 ||  || — || October 4, 1999 || Socorro || LINEAR || — || align=right | 4.4 km || 
|-id=473 bgcolor=#E9E9E9
| 70473 ||  || — || October 4, 1999 || Socorro || LINEAR || — || align=right | 3.5 km || 
|-id=474 bgcolor=#fefefe
| 70474 ||  || — || October 4, 1999 || Socorro || LINEAR || PHO || align=right | 3.4 km || 
|-id=475 bgcolor=#E9E9E9
| 70475 ||  || — || October 4, 1999 || Socorro || LINEAR || HNS || align=right | 3.1 km || 
|-id=476 bgcolor=#E9E9E9
| 70476 ||  || — || October 13, 1999 || Anderson Mesa || LONEOS || — || align=right | 3.3 km || 
|-id=477 bgcolor=#fefefe
| 70477 ||  || — || October 1, 1999 || Catalina || CSS || — || align=right | 2.5 km || 
|-id=478 bgcolor=#fefefe
| 70478 ||  || — || October 5, 1999 || Catalina || CSS || V || align=right | 2.3 km || 
|-id=479 bgcolor=#E9E9E9
| 70479 ||  || — || October 2, 1999 || Kitt Peak || Spacewatch || — || align=right | 3.9 km || 
|-id=480 bgcolor=#fefefe
| 70480 ||  || — || October 3, 1999 || Kitt Peak || Spacewatch || MAS || align=right | 1.7 km || 
|-id=481 bgcolor=#E9E9E9
| 70481 ||  || — || October 3, 1999 || Kitt Peak || Spacewatch || GEF || align=right | 2.6 km || 
|-id=482 bgcolor=#E9E9E9
| 70482 ||  || — || October 3, 1999 || Kitt Peak || Spacewatch || — || align=right | 1.5 km || 
|-id=483 bgcolor=#fefefe
| 70483 ||  || — || October 4, 1999 || Kitt Peak || Spacewatch || NYS || align=right | 1.7 km || 
|-id=484 bgcolor=#E9E9E9
| 70484 ||  || — || October 4, 1999 || Kitt Peak || Spacewatch || — || align=right | 2.6 km || 
|-id=485 bgcolor=#E9E9E9
| 70485 ||  || — || October 4, 1999 || Kitt Peak || Spacewatch || — || align=right | 2.4 km || 
|-id=486 bgcolor=#fefefe
| 70486 ||  || — || October 6, 1999 || Kitt Peak || Spacewatch || NYS || align=right | 1.9 km || 
|-id=487 bgcolor=#fefefe
| 70487 ||  || — || October 6, 1999 || Kitt Peak || Spacewatch || FLO || align=right | 1.7 km || 
|-id=488 bgcolor=#E9E9E9
| 70488 ||  || — || October 6, 1999 || Kitt Peak || Spacewatch || — || align=right | 2.8 km || 
|-id=489 bgcolor=#E9E9E9
| 70489 ||  || — || October 6, 1999 || Kitt Peak || Spacewatch || — || align=right | 3.0 km || 
|-id=490 bgcolor=#E9E9E9
| 70490 ||  || — || October 6, 1999 || Kitt Peak || Spacewatch || — || align=right | 2.6 km || 
|-id=491 bgcolor=#E9E9E9
| 70491 ||  || — || October 6, 1999 || Kitt Peak || Spacewatch || — || align=right | 4.2 km || 
|-id=492 bgcolor=#fefefe
| 70492 ||  || — || October 7, 1999 || Kitt Peak || Spacewatch || NYS || align=right | 1.2 km || 
|-id=493 bgcolor=#fefefe
| 70493 ||  || — || October 8, 1999 || Kitt Peak || Spacewatch || MAS || align=right | 1.3 km || 
|-id=494 bgcolor=#E9E9E9
| 70494 ||  || — || October 8, 1999 || Kitt Peak || Spacewatch || — || align=right | 3.0 km || 
|-id=495 bgcolor=#E9E9E9
| 70495 ||  || — || October 9, 1999 || Kitt Peak || Spacewatch || — || align=right | 5.5 km || 
|-id=496 bgcolor=#E9E9E9
| 70496 ||  || — || October 9, 1999 || Kitt Peak || Spacewatch || — || align=right | 4.9 km || 
|-id=497 bgcolor=#fefefe
| 70497 ||  || — || October 15, 1999 || Kitt Peak || Spacewatch || — || align=right | 2.0 km || 
|-id=498 bgcolor=#fefefe
| 70498 ||  || — || October 2, 1999 || Socorro || LINEAR || — || align=right | 2.1 km || 
|-id=499 bgcolor=#fefefe
| 70499 ||  || — || October 2, 1999 || Socorro || LINEAR || NYS || align=right | 2.3 km || 
|-id=500 bgcolor=#fefefe
| 70500 ||  || — || October 2, 1999 || Socorro || LINEAR || — || align=right | 2.0 km || 
|}

70501–70600 

|-bgcolor=#E9E9E9
| 70501 ||  || — || October 2, 1999 || Socorro || LINEAR || — || align=right | 2.9 km || 
|-id=502 bgcolor=#E9E9E9
| 70502 ||  || — || October 2, 1999 || Socorro || LINEAR || — || align=right | 5.2 km || 
|-id=503 bgcolor=#fefefe
| 70503 ||  || — || October 2, 1999 || Socorro || LINEAR || — || align=right | 2.8 km || 
|-id=504 bgcolor=#E9E9E9
| 70504 ||  || — || October 2, 1999 || Socorro || LINEAR || HNS || align=right | 2.7 km || 
|-id=505 bgcolor=#E9E9E9
| 70505 ||  || — || October 2, 1999 || Socorro || LINEAR || — || align=right | 3.4 km || 
|-id=506 bgcolor=#E9E9E9
| 70506 ||  || — || October 2, 1999 || Socorro || LINEAR || — || align=right | 5.5 km || 
|-id=507 bgcolor=#E9E9E9
| 70507 ||  || — || October 2, 1999 || Socorro || LINEAR || MAR || align=right | 2.2 km || 
|-id=508 bgcolor=#E9E9E9
| 70508 ||  || — || October 2, 1999 || Socorro || LINEAR || EUN || align=right | 2.7 km || 
|-id=509 bgcolor=#E9E9E9
| 70509 ||  || — || October 2, 1999 || Socorro || LINEAR || — || align=right | 3.1 km || 
|-id=510 bgcolor=#fefefe
| 70510 ||  || — || October 3, 1999 || Socorro || LINEAR || V || align=right | 1.7 km || 
|-id=511 bgcolor=#fefefe
| 70511 ||  || — || October 3, 1999 || Socorro || LINEAR || ERI || align=right | 4.6 km || 
|-id=512 bgcolor=#fefefe
| 70512 ||  || — || October 3, 1999 || Socorro || LINEAR || V || align=right | 2.1 km || 
|-id=513 bgcolor=#fefefe
| 70513 ||  || — || October 3, 1999 || Socorro || LINEAR || V || align=right | 2.1 km || 
|-id=514 bgcolor=#fefefe
| 70514 ||  || — || October 3, 1999 || Socorro || LINEAR || V || align=right | 2.1 km || 
|-id=515 bgcolor=#E9E9E9
| 70515 ||  || — || October 3, 1999 || Socorro || LINEAR || — || align=right | 7.1 km || 
|-id=516 bgcolor=#fefefe
| 70516 ||  || — || October 3, 1999 || Socorro || LINEAR || — || align=right | 3.8 km || 
|-id=517 bgcolor=#E9E9E9
| 70517 ||  || — || October 3, 1999 || Socorro || LINEAR || — || align=right | 2.9 km || 
|-id=518 bgcolor=#fefefe
| 70518 ||  || — || October 4, 1999 || Socorro || LINEAR || — || align=right | 1.8 km || 
|-id=519 bgcolor=#fefefe
| 70519 ||  || — || October 4, 1999 || Socorro || LINEAR || — || align=right | 2.4 km || 
|-id=520 bgcolor=#E9E9E9
| 70520 ||  || — || October 4, 1999 || Socorro || LINEAR || — || align=right | 2.6 km || 
|-id=521 bgcolor=#fefefe
| 70521 ||  || — || October 4, 1999 || Socorro || LINEAR || — || align=right | 2.8 km || 
|-id=522 bgcolor=#fefefe
| 70522 ||  || — || October 4, 1999 || Socorro || LINEAR || — || align=right | 4.4 km || 
|-id=523 bgcolor=#fefefe
| 70523 ||  || — || October 4, 1999 || Socorro || LINEAR || — || align=right | 1.9 km || 
|-id=524 bgcolor=#fefefe
| 70524 ||  || — || October 4, 1999 || Socorro || LINEAR || — || align=right | 3.3 km || 
|-id=525 bgcolor=#E9E9E9
| 70525 ||  || — || October 4, 1999 || Socorro || LINEAR || MAR || align=right | 2.0 km || 
|-id=526 bgcolor=#E9E9E9
| 70526 ||  || — || October 4, 1999 || Socorro || LINEAR || — || align=right | 1.7 km || 
|-id=527 bgcolor=#E9E9E9
| 70527 ||  || — || October 4, 1999 || Socorro || LINEAR || — || align=right | 2.4 km || 
|-id=528 bgcolor=#fefefe
| 70528 ||  || — || October 4, 1999 || Socorro || LINEAR || SUL || align=right | 2.4 km || 
|-id=529 bgcolor=#fefefe
| 70529 ||  || — || October 4, 1999 || Socorro || LINEAR || NYS || align=right | 1.4 km || 
|-id=530 bgcolor=#fefefe
| 70530 ||  || — || October 4, 1999 || Socorro || LINEAR || V || align=right | 1.4 km || 
|-id=531 bgcolor=#E9E9E9
| 70531 ||  || — || October 4, 1999 || Socorro || LINEAR || — || align=right | 3.1 km || 
|-id=532 bgcolor=#E9E9E9
| 70532 ||  || — || October 4, 1999 || Socorro || LINEAR || — || align=right | 1.9 km || 
|-id=533 bgcolor=#fefefe
| 70533 ||  || — || October 4, 1999 || Socorro || LINEAR || — || align=right | 2.8 km || 
|-id=534 bgcolor=#E9E9E9
| 70534 ||  || — || October 4, 1999 || Socorro || LINEAR || — || align=right | 1.9 km || 
|-id=535 bgcolor=#fefefe
| 70535 ||  || — || October 4, 1999 || Socorro || LINEAR || — || align=right | 2.5 km || 
|-id=536 bgcolor=#E9E9E9
| 70536 ||  || — || October 4, 1999 || Socorro || LINEAR || — || align=right | 4.1 km || 
|-id=537 bgcolor=#E9E9E9
| 70537 ||  || — || October 4, 1999 || Socorro || LINEAR || — || align=right | 1.9 km || 
|-id=538 bgcolor=#E9E9E9
| 70538 ||  || — || October 4, 1999 || Socorro || LINEAR || RAF || align=right | 3.7 km || 
|-id=539 bgcolor=#E9E9E9
| 70539 ||  || — || October 4, 1999 || Socorro || LINEAR || — || align=right | 2.7 km || 
|-id=540 bgcolor=#E9E9E9
| 70540 ||  || — || October 4, 1999 || Socorro || LINEAR || — || align=right | 4.5 km || 
|-id=541 bgcolor=#E9E9E9
| 70541 ||  || — || October 4, 1999 || Socorro || LINEAR || — || align=right | 2.2 km || 
|-id=542 bgcolor=#fefefe
| 70542 ||  || — || October 4, 1999 || Socorro || LINEAR || NYS || align=right | 2.0 km || 
|-id=543 bgcolor=#fefefe
| 70543 ||  || — || October 4, 1999 || Socorro || LINEAR || — || align=right | 2.2 km || 
|-id=544 bgcolor=#fefefe
| 70544 ||  || — || October 4, 1999 || Socorro || LINEAR || — || align=right | 5.2 km || 
|-id=545 bgcolor=#fefefe
| 70545 ||  || — || October 4, 1999 || Socorro || LINEAR || — || align=right | 4.1 km || 
|-id=546 bgcolor=#E9E9E9
| 70546 ||  || — || October 4, 1999 || Socorro || LINEAR || — || align=right | 3.0 km || 
|-id=547 bgcolor=#fefefe
| 70547 ||  || — || October 6, 1999 || Socorro || LINEAR || NYS || align=right | 2.6 km || 
|-id=548 bgcolor=#E9E9E9
| 70548 ||  || — || October 6, 1999 || Socorro || LINEAR || — || align=right | 5.6 km || 
|-id=549 bgcolor=#E9E9E9
| 70549 ||  || — || October 6, 1999 || Socorro || LINEAR || — || align=right | 3.1 km || 
|-id=550 bgcolor=#E9E9E9
| 70550 ||  || — || October 6, 1999 || Socorro || LINEAR || — || align=right | 2.2 km || 
|-id=551 bgcolor=#E9E9E9
| 70551 ||  || — || October 6, 1999 || Socorro || LINEAR || EUN || align=right | 2.8 km || 
|-id=552 bgcolor=#E9E9E9
| 70552 ||  || — || October 6, 1999 || Socorro || LINEAR || — || align=right | 3.4 km || 
|-id=553 bgcolor=#E9E9E9
| 70553 ||  || — || October 6, 1999 || Socorro || LINEAR || — || align=right | 6.0 km || 
|-id=554 bgcolor=#E9E9E9
| 70554 ||  || — || October 6, 1999 || Socorro || LINEAR || — || align=right | 2.7 km || 
|-id=555 bgcolor=#E9E9E9
| 70555 ||  || — || October 6, 1999 || Socorro || LINEAR || EUN || align=right | 2.0 km || 
|-id=556 bgcolor=#E9E9E9
| 70556 ||  || — || October 6, 1999 || Socorro || LINEAR || — || align=right | 3.0 km || 
|-id=557 bgcolor=#E9E9E9
| 70557 ||  || — || October 6, 1999 || Socorro || LINEAR || — || align=right | 3.2 km || 
|-id=558 bgcolor=#E9E9E9
| 70558 ||  || — || October 6, 1999 || Socorro || LINEAR || — || align=right | 1.8 km || 
|-id=559 bgcolor=#fefefe
| 70559 ||  || — || October 7, 1999 || Socorro || LINEAR || — || align=right | 4.0 km || 
|-id=560 bgcolor=#fefefe
| 70560 ||  || — || October 7, 1999 || Socorro || LINEAR || — || align=right | 2.0 km || 
|-id=561 bgcolor=#fefefe
| 70561 ||  || — || October 7, 1999 || Socorro || LINEAR || FLO || align=right | 3.5 km || 
|-id=562 bgcolor=#E9E9E9
| 70562 ||  || — || October 7, 1999 || Socorro || LINEAR || — || align=right | 3.2 km || 
|-id=563 bgcolor=#E9E9E9
| 70563 ||  || — || October 7, 1999 || Socorro || LINEAR || — || align=right | 2.7 km || 
|-id=564 bgcolor=#E9E9E9
| 70564 ||  || — || October 7, 1999 || Socorro || LINEAR || — || align=right | 2.8 km || 
|-id=565 bgcolor=#E9E9E9
| 70565 ||  || — || October 7, 1999 || Socorro || LINEAR || — || align=right | 2.5 km || 
|-id=566 bgcolor=#E9E9E9
| 70566 ||  || — || October 7, 1999 || Socorro || LINEAR || — || align=right | 3.3 km || 
|-id=567 bgcolor=#E9E9E9
| 70567 ||  || — || October 7, 1999 || Socorro || LINEAR || — || align=right | 4.8 km || 
|-id=568 bgcolor=#E9E9E9
| 70568 ||  || — || October 7, 1999 || Socorro || LINEAR || — || align=right | 5.2 km || 
|-id=569 bgcolor=#E9E9E9
| 70569 ||  || — || October 7, 1999 || Socorro || LINEAR || — || align=right | 1.9 km || 
|-id=570 bgcolor=#E9E9E9
| 70570 ||  || — || October 7, 1999 || Socorro || LINEAR || — || align=right | 3.4 km || 
|-id=571 bgcolor=#E9E9E9
| 70571 ||  || — || October 8, 1999 || Socorro || LINEAR || — || align=right | 2.9 km || 
|-id=572 bgcolor=#fefefe
| 70572 ||  || — || October 9, 1999 || Socorro || LINEAR || — || align=right | 2.0 km || 
|-id=573 bgcolor=#E9E9E9
| 70573 ||  || — || October 9, 1999 || Socorro || LINEAR || — || align=right | 2.2 km || 
|-id=574 bgcolor=#E9E9E9
| 70574 ||  || — || October 9, 1999 || Socorro || LINEAR || — || align=right | 2.3 km || 
|-id=575 bgcolor=#fefefe
| 70575 ||  || — || October 9, 1999 || Socorro || LINEAR || — || align=right | 6.1 km || 
|-id=576 bgcolor=#E9E9E9
| 70576 ||  || — || October 9, 1999 || Socorro || LINEAR || — || align=right | 1.9 km || 
|-id=577 bgcolor=#E9E9E9
| 70577 ||  || — || October 9, 1999 || Socorro || LINEAR || — || align=right | 2.7 km || 
|-id=578 bgcolor=#E9E9E9
| 70578 ||  || — || October 9, 1999 || Socorro || LINEAR || — || align=right | 3.6 km || 
|-id=579 bgcolor=#E9E9E9
| 70579 ||  || — || October 10, 1999 || Socorro || LINEAR || — || align=right | 2.1 km || 
|-id=580 bgcolor=#E9E9E9
| 70580 ||  || — || October 10, 1999 || Socorro || LINEAR || — || align=right | 3.2 km || 
|-id=581 bgcolor=#fefefe
| 70581 ||  || — || October 10, 1999 || Socorro || LINEAR || — || align=right | 2.4 km || 
|-id=582 bgcolor=#fefefe
| 70582 ||  || — || October 10, 1999 || Socorro || LINEAR || — || align=right | 2.7 km || 
|-id=583 bgcolor=#fefefe
| 70583 ||  || — || October 10, 1999 || Socorro || LINEAR || — || align=right | 3.0 km || 
|-id=584 bgcolor=#E9E9E9
| 70584 ||  || — || October 10, 1999 || Socorro || LINEAR || — || align=right | 2.4 km || 
|-id=585 bgcolor=#fefefe
| 70585 ||  || — || October 10, 1999 || Socorro || LINEAR || NYS || align=right | 2.0 km || 
|-id=586 bgcolor=#E9E9E9
| 70586 ||  || — || October 10, 1999 || Socorro || LINEAR || — || align=right | 2.9 km || 
|-id=587 bgcolor=#E9E9E9
| 70587 ||  || — || October 10, 1999 || Socorro || LINEAR || PAD || align=right | 4.4 km || 
|-id=588 bgcolor=#E9E9E9
| 70588 ||  || — || October 10, 1999 || Socorro || LINEAR || — || align=right | 3.0 km || 
|-id=589 bgcolor=#E9E9E9
| 70589 ||  || — || October 10, 1999 || Socorro || LINEAR || — || align=right | 2.1 km || 
|-id=590 bgcolor=#E9E9E9
| 70590 ||  || — || October 10, 1999 || Socorro || LINEAR || — || align=right | 2.8 km || 
|-id=591 bgcolor=#fefefe
| 70591 ||  || — || October 10, 1999 || Socorro || LINEAR || — || align=right | 2.3 km || 
|-id=592 bgcolor=#E9E9E9
| 70592 ||  || — || October 10, 1999 || Socorro || LINEAR || AGN || align=right | 3.2 km || 
|-id=593 bgcolor=#E9E9E9
| 70593 ||  || — || October 10, 1999 || Socorro || LINEAR || — || align=right | 3.3 km || 
|-id=594 bgcolor=#E9E9E9
| 70594 ||  || — || October 10, 1999 || Socorro || LINEAR || — || align=right | 4.9 km || 
|-id=595 bgcolor=#d6d6d6
| 70595 ||  || — || October 10, 1999 || Socorro || LINEAR || — || align=right | 4.6 km || 
|-id=596 bgcolor=#E9E9E9
| 70596 ||  || — || October 10, 1999 || Socorro || LINEAR || — || align=right | 2.0 km || 
|-id=597 bgcolor=#E9E9E9
| 70597 ||  || — || October 11, 1999 || Socorro || LINEAR || — || align=right | 4.1 km || 
|-id=598 bgcolor=#E9E9E9
| 70598 ||  || — || October 12, 1999 || Socorro || LINEAR || — || align=right | 4.8 km || 
|-id=599 bgcolor=#d6d6d6
| 70599 ||  || — || October 12, 1999 || Socorro || LINEAR || DUR || align=right | 9.6 km || 
|-id=600 bgcolor=#E9E9E9
| 70600 ||  || — || October 12, 1999 || Socorro || LINEAR || ADE || align=right | 6.8 km || 
|}

70601–70700 

|-bgcolor=#fefefe
| 70601 ||  || — || October 12, 1999 || Socorro || LINEAR || — || align=right | 2.4 km || 
|-id=602 bgcolor=#E9E9E9
| 70602 ||  || — || October 12, 1999 || Socorro || LINEAR || — || align=right | 4.0 km || 
|-id=603 bgcolor=#E9E9E9
| 70603 ||  || — || October 12, 1999 || Socorro || LINEAR || MAR || align=right | 2.7 km || 
|-id=604 bgcolor=#E9E9E9
| 70604 ||  || — || October 12, 1999 || Socorro || LINEAR || — || align=right | 4.3 km || 
|-id=605 bgcolor=#E9E9E9
| 70605 ||  || — || October 12, 1999 || Socorro || LINEAR || — || align=right | 2.2 km || 
|-id=606 bgcolor=#E9E9E9
| 70606 ||  || — || October 12, 1999 || Socorro || LINEAR || PAD || align=right | 4.5 km || 
|-id=607 bgcolor=#E9E9E9
| 70607 ||  || — || October 12, 1999 || Socorro || LINEAR || — || align=right | 3.5 km || 
|-id=608 bgcolor=#E9E9E9
| 70608 ||  || — || October 12, 1999 || Socorro || LINEAR || — || align=right | 3.5 km || 
|-id=609 bgcolor=#E9E9E9
| 70609 ||  || — || October 12, 1999 || Socorro || LINEAR || — || align=right | 3.1 km || 
|-id=610 bgcolor=#E9E9E9
| 70610 ||  || — || October 12, 1999 || Socorro || LINEAR || HNS || align=right | 3.2 km || 
|-id=611 bgcolor=#E9E9E9
| 70611 ||  || — || October 12, 1999 || Socorro || LINEAR || — || align=right | 2.3 km || 
|-id=612 bgcolor=#E9E9E9
| 70612 ||  || — || October 12, 1999 || Socorro || LINEAR || — || align=right | 2.4 km || 
|-id=613 bgcolor=#E9E9E9
| 70613 ||  || — || October 13, 1999 || Socorro || LINEAR || — || align=right | 1.7 km || 
|-id=614 bgcolor=#E9E9E9
| 70614 ||  || — || October 13, 1999 || Socorro || LINEAR || — || align=right | 4.9 km || 
|-id=615 bgcolor=#E9E9E9
| 70615 ||  || — || October 13, 1999 || Socorro || LINEAR || — || align=right | 3.0 km || 
|-id=616 bgcolor=#E9E9E9
| 70616 ||  || — || October 13, 1999 || Socorro || LINEAR || — || align=right | 1.7 km || 
|-id=617 bgcolor=#E9E9E9
| 70617 ||  || — || October 14, 1999 || Socorro || LINEAR || — || align=right | 6.1 km || 
|-id=618 bgcolor=#E9E9E9
| 70618 ||  || — || October 14, 1999 || Socorro || LINEAR || — || align=right | 3.6 km || 
|-id=619 bgcolor=#fefefe
| 70619 ||  || — || October 15, 1999 || Socorro || LINEAR || — || align=right | 2.4 km || 
|-id=620 bgcolor=#fefefe
| 70620 ||  || — || October 15, 1999 || Socorro || LINEAR || V || align=right | 2.6 km || 
|-id=621 bgcolor=#E9E9E9
| 70621 ||  || — || October 15, 1999 || Socorro || LINEAR || — || align=right | 4.2 km || 
|-id=622 bgcolor=#E9E9E9
| 70622 ||  || — || October 15, 1999 || Socorro || LINEAR || — || align=right | 3.7 km || 
|-id=623 bgcolor=#E9E9E9
| 70623 ||  || — || October 15, 1999 || Socorro || LINEAR || — || align=right | 4.1 km || 
|-id=624 bgcolor=#E9E9E9
| 70624 ||  || — || October 15, 1999 || Socorro || LINEAR || — || align=right | 1.9 km || 
|-id=625 bgcolor=#E9E9E9
| 70625 ||  || — || October 15, 1999 || Socorro || LINEAR || EUN || align=right | 3.6 km || 
|-id=626 bgcolor=#E9E9E9
| 70626 ||  || — || October 15, 1999 || Socorro || LINEAR || — || align=right | 5.2 km || 
|-id=627 bgcolor=#E9E9E9
| 70627 ||  || — || October 15, 1999 || Socorro || LINEAR || — || align=right | 2.0 km || 
|-id=628 bgcolor=#E9E9E9
| 70628 ||  || — || October 15, 1999 || Socorro || LINEAR || — || align=right | 5.0 km || 
|-id=629 bgcolor=#E9E9E9
| 70629 ||  || — || October 15, 1999 || Socorro || LINEAR || — || align=right | 1.7 km || 
|-id=630 bgcolor=#fefefe
| 70630 ||  || — || October 1, 1999 || Catalina || CSS || — || align=right | 2.3 km || 
|-id=631 bgcolor=#E9E9E9
| 70631 ||  || — || October 1, 1999 || Catalina || CSS || — || align=right | 3.0 km || 
|-id=632 bgcolor=#E9E9E9
| 70632 ||  || — || October 1, 1999 || Catalina || CSS || — || align=right | 3.8 km || 
|-id=633 bgcolor=#E9E9E9
| 70633 ||  || — || October 12, 1999 || Socorro || LINEAR || — || align=right | 3.8 km || 
|-id=634 bgcolor=#fefefe
| 70634 ||  || — || October 2, 1999 || Socorro || LINEAR || — || align=right | 2.2 km || 
|-id=635 bgcolor=#E9E9E9
| 70635 ||  || — || October 1, 1999 || Kitt Peak || Spacewatch || — || align=right | 3.0 km || 
|-id=636 bgcolor=#E9E9E9
| 70636 ||  || — || October 3, 1999 || Catalina || CSS || — || align=right | 3.2 km || 
|-id=637 bgcolor=#E9E9E9
| 70637 ||  || — || October 3, 1999 || Socorro || LINEAR || — || align=right | 3.8 km || 
|-id=638 bgcolor=#E9E9E9
| 70638 ||  || — || October 7, 1999 || Catalina || CSS || — || align=right | 5.4 km || 
|-id=639 bgcolor=#E9E9E9
| 70639 ||  || — || October 3, 1999 || Catalina || CSS || — || align=right | 3.6 km || 
|-id=640 bgcolor=#E9E9E9
| 70640 ||  || — || October 4, 1999 || Catalina || CSS || — || align=right | 2.6 km || 
|-id=641 bgcolor=#E9E9E9
| 70641 ||  || — || October 4, 1999 || Catalina || CSS || — || align=right | 2.8 km || 
|-id=642 bgcolor=#E9E9E9
| 70642 ||  || — || October 4, 1999 || Catalina || CSS || — || align=right | 2.4 km || 
|-id=643 bgcolor=#E9E9E9
| 70643 ||  || — || October 4, 1999 || Catalina || CSS || — || align=right | 3.2 km || 
|-id=644 bgcolor=#E9E9E9
| 70644 ||  || — || October 4, 1999 || Catalina || CSS || — || align=right | 4.6 km || 
|-id=645 bgcolor=#E9E9E9
| 70645 ||  || — || October 5, 1999 || Anderson Mesa || LONEOS || — || align=right | 2.3 km || 
|-id=646 bgcolor=#fefefe
| 70646 ||  || — || October 7, 1999 || Catalina || CSS || V || align=right | 1.5 km || 
|-id=647 bgcolor=#fefefe
| 70647 ||  || — || October 7, 1999 || Catalina || CSS || — || align=right | 2.3 km || 
|-id=648 bgcolor=#E9E9E9
| 70648 ||  || — || October 7, 1999 || Catalina || CSS || EUN || align=right | 2.3 km || 
|-id=649 bgcolor=#E9E9E9
| 70649 ||  || — || October 8, 1999 || Catalina || CSS || — || align=right | 5.0 km || 
|-id=650 bgcolor=#fefefe
| 70650 ||  || — || October 8, 1999 || Catalina || CSS || — || align=right | 2.8 km || 
|-id=651 bgcolor=#E9E9E9
| 70651 ||  || — || October 8, 1999 || Catalina || CSS || ADE || align=right | 5.2 km || 
|-id=652 bgcolor=#d6d6d6
| 70652 ||  || — || October 8, 1999 || Catalina || CSS || BRA || align=right | 4.6 km || 
|-id=653 bgcolor=#E9E9E9
| 70653 ||  || — || October 8, 1999 || Socorro || LINEAR || — || align=right | 4.1 km || 
|-id=654 bgcolor=#E9E9E9
| 70654 ||  || — || October 9, 1999 || Kitt Peak || Spacewatch || — || align=right | 2.2 km || 
|-id=655 bgcolor=#fefefe
| 70655 ||  || — || October 9, 1999 || Socorro || LINEAR || — || align=right | 2.5 km || 
|-id=656 bgcolor=#fefefe
| 70656 ||  || — || October 9, 1999 || Socorro || LINEAR || — || align=right | 2.2 km || 
|-id=657 bgcolor=#E9E9E9
| 70657 ||  || — || October 9, 1999 || Socorro || LINEAR || — || align=right | 2.2 km || 
|-id=658 bgcolor=#fefefe
| 70658 ||  || — || October 13, 1999 || Kitt Peak || Spacewatch || NYS || align=right | 1.5 km || 
|-id=659 bgcolor=#E9E9E9
| 70659 ||  || — || October 3, 1999 || Socorro || LINEAR || MIT || align=right | 5.7 km || 
|-id=660 bgcolor=#E9E9E9
| 70660 ||  || — || October 3, 1999 || Socorro || LINEAR || — || align=right | 3.0 km || 
|-id=661 bgcolor=#fefefe
| 70661 ||  || — || October 6, 1999 || Socorro || LINEAR || NYS || align=right | 1.4 km || 
|-id=662 bgcolor=#E9E9E9
| 70662 ||  || — || October 9, 1999 || Socorro || LINEAR || — || align=right | 3.4 km || 
|-id=663 bgcolor=#E9E9E9
| 70663 ||  || — || October 9, 1999 || Socorro || LINEAR || — || align=right | 2.8 km || 
|-id=664 bgcolor=#fefefe
| 70664 ||  || — || October 10, 1999 || Socorro || LINEAR || V || align=right | 1.3 km || 
|-id=665 bgcolor=#fefefe
| 70665 ||  || — || October 10, 1999 || Socorro || LINEAR || — || align=right | 2.0 km || 
|-id=666 bgcolor=#E9E9E9
| 70666 ||  || — || October 10, 1999 || Socorro || LINEAR || HNS || align=right | 2.9 km || 
|-id=667 bgcolor=#fefefe
| 70667 ||  || — || October 10, 1999 || Socorro || LINEAR || — || align=right | 2.4 km || 
|-id=668 bgcolor=#E9E9E9
| 70668 ||  || — || October 10, 1999 || Socorro || LINEAR || — || align=right | 2.0 km || 
|-id=669 bgcolor=#E9E9E9
| 70669 ||  || — || October 10, 1999 || Socorro || LINEAR || — || align=right | 3.3 km || 
|-id=670 bgcolor=#E9E9E9
| 70670 ||  || — || October 10, 1999 || Socorro || LINEAR || — || align=right | 2.6 km || 
|-id=671 bgcolor=#E9E9E9
| 70671 ||  || — || October 10, 1999 || Socorro || LINEAR || — || align=right | 2.1 km || 
|-id=672 bgcolor=#E9E9E9
| 70672 ||  || — || October 12, 1999 || Socorro || LINEAR || — || align=right | 2.8 km || 
|-id=673 bgcolor=#E9E9E9
| 70673 ||  || — || October 5, 1999 || Anderson Mesa || LONEOS || — || align=right | 3.1 km || 
|-id=674 bgcolor=#fefefe
| 70674 ||  || — || October 10, 1999 || Socorro || LINEAR || — || align=right | 2.2 km || 
|-id=675 bgcolor=#E9E9E9
| 70675 ||  || — || October 14, 1999 || Socorro || LINEAR || MAR || align=right | 4.3 km || 
|-id=676 bgcolor=#fefefe
| 70676 || 1999 UM || — || October 16, 1999 || Višnjan Observatory || K. Korlević || NYS || align=right | 1.6 km || 
|-id=677 bgcolor=#E9E9E9
| 70677 || 1999 UU || — || October 16, 1999 || Višnjan Observatory || K. Korlević || — || align=right | 2.8 km || 
|-id=678 bgcolor=#E9E9E9
| 70678 ||  || — || October 18, 1999 || Farpoint || Farpoint Obs. || PAD || align=right | 3.5 km || 
|-id=679 bgcolor=#E9E9E9
| 70679 Urzidil ||  ||  || October 30, 1999 || Kleť || J. Tichá, M. Tichý || — || align=right | 2.2 km || 
|-id=680 bgcolor=#E9E9E9
| 70680 ||  || — || October 31, 1999 || Fountain Hills || C. W. Juels || — || align=right | 5.0 km || 
|-id=681 bgcolor=#E9E9E9
| 70681 ||  || — || October 31, 1999 || Ondřejov || L. Kotková || HEN || align=right | 5.1 km || 
|-id=682 bgcolor=#E9E9E9
| 70682 ||  || — || October 29, 1999 || Catalina || CSS || — || align=right | 4.5 km || 
|-id=683 bgcolor=#E9E9E9
| 70683 ||  || — || October 29, 1999 || Catalina || CSS || — || align=right | 4.5 km || 
|-id=684 bgcolor=#E9E9E9
| 70684 ||  || — || October 29, 1999 || Catalina || CSS || — || align=right | 6.1 km || 
|-id=685 bgcolor=#E9E9E9
| 70685 ||  || — || October 29, 1999 || Catalina || CSS || — || align=right | 4.7 km || 
|-id=686 bgcolor=#E9E9E9
| 70686 ||  || — || October 29, 1999 || Catalina || CSS || — || align=right | 2.1 km || 
|-id=687 bgcolor=#E9E9E9
| 70687 ||  || — || October 29, 1999 || Catalina || CSS || — || align=right | 1.9 km || 
|-id=688 bgcolor=#E9E9E9
| 70688 ||  || — || October 29, 1999 || Catalina || CSS || — || align=right | 5.5 km || 
|-id=689 bgcolor=#E9E9E9
| 70689 ||  || — || October 29, 1999 || Catalina || CSS || — || align=right | 5.3 km || 
|-id=690 bgcolor=#E9E9E9
| 70690 ||  || — || October 31, 1999 || Catalina || CSS || EUN || align=right | 3.2 km || 
|-id=691 bgcolor=#fefefe
| 70691 ||  || — || October 30, 1999 || Kitt Peak || Spacewatch || V || align=right | 1.8 km || 
|-id=692 bgcolor=#E9E9E9
| 70692 ||  || — || October 31, 1999 || Kitt Peak || Spacewatch || — || align=right | 4.4 km || 
|-id=693 bgcolor=#fefefe
| 70693 ||  || — || October 28, 1999 || Catalina || CSS || V || align=right | 2.5 km || 
|-id=694 bgcolor=#fefefe
| 70694 ||  || — || October 28, 1999 || Catalina || CSS || V || align=right | 2.6 km || 
|-id=695 bgcolor=#E9E9E9
| 70695 ||  || — || October 29, 1999 || Catalina || CSS || — || align=right | 3.3 km || 
|-id=696 bgcolor=#E9E9E9
| 70696 ||  || — || October 30, 1999 || Catalina || CSS || — || align=right | 2.7 km || 
|-id=697 bgcolor=#E9E9E9
| 70697 ||  || — || October 30, 1999 || Catalina || CSS || — || align=right | 6.2 km || 
|-id=698 bgcolor=#E9E9E9
| 70698 ||  || — || October 30, 1999 || Catalina || CSS || — || align=right | 2.7 km || 
|-id=699 bgcolor=#fefefe
| 70699 ||  || — || October 30, 1999 || Kitt Peak || Spacewatch || NYS || align=right | 4.4 km || 
|-id=700 bgcolor=#fefefe
| 70700 ||  || — || October 31, 1999 || Kitt Peak || Spacewatch || — || align=right | 3.6 km || 
|}

70701–70800 

|-bgcolor=#E9E9E9
| 70701 ||  || — || October 31, 1999 || Kitt Peak || Spacewatch || — || align=right | 1.9 km || 
|-id=702 bgcolor=#fefefe
| 70702 ||  || — || October 16, 1999 || Kitt Peak || Spacewatch || — || align=right | 2.0 km || 
|-id=703 bgcolor=#fefefe
| 70703 ||  || — || October 29, 1999 || Anderson Mesa || LONEOS || V || align=right | 3.1 km || 
|-id=704 bgcolor=#E9E9E9
| 70704 ||  || — || October 30, 1999 || Anderson Mesa || LONEOS || — || align=right | 2.8 km || 
|-id=705 bgcolor=#E9E9E9
| 70705 ||  || — || October 16, 1999 || Socorro || LINEAR || MAR || align=right | 1.8 km || 
|-id=706 bgcolor=#E9E9E9
| 70706 ||  || — || October 18, 1999 || Kitt Peak || Spacewatch || — || align=right | 4.1 km || 
|-id=707 bgcolor=#E9E9E9
| 70707 ||  || — || October 20, 1999 || Socorro || LINEAR || — || align=right | 5.2 km || 
|-id=708 bgcolor=#E9E9E9
| 70708 ||  || — || October 28, 1999 || Catalina || CSS || — || align=right | 7.4 km || 
|-id=709 bgcolor=#E9E9E9
| 70709 ||  || — || October 29, 1999 || Catalina || CSS || MRX || align=right | 3.1 km || 
|-id=710 bgcolor=#E9E9E9
| 70710 Chuckfellows ||  ||  || October 29, 1999 || Catalina || CSS || — || align=right | 2.8 km || 
|-id=711 bgcolor=#fefefe
| 70711 Arlinbartels ||  ||  || October 30, 1999 || Catalina || CSS || NYS || align=right | 1.9 km || 
|-id=712 bgcolor=#E9E9E9
| 70712 Danieljoanna ||  ||  || October 31, 1999 || Catalina || CSS || ADE || align=right | 2.9 km || 
|-id=713 bgcolor=#E9E9E9
| 70713 Sethmacfarlane ||  ||  || October 31, 1999 || Catalina || CSS || RAF || align=right | 2.3 km || 
|-id=714 bgcolor=#E9E9E9
| 70714 Rizk ||  ||  || October 30, 1999 || Catalina || CSS || — || align=right | 3.7 km || 
|-id=715 bgcolor=#E9E9E9
| 70715 Allancheuvront ||  ||  || October 30, 1999 || Catalina || CSS || — || align=right | 2.1 km || 
|-id=716 bgcolor=#E9E9E9
| 70716 Mehall ||  ||  || October 30, 1999 || Catalina || CSS || — || align=right | 1.7 km || 
|-id=717 bgcolor=#E9E9E9
| 70717 ||  || — || October 31, 1999 || Anderson Mesa || LONEOS || — || align=right | 3.6 km || 
|-id=718 bgcolor=#E9E9E9
| 70718 HEAF ||  ||  || October 31, 1999 || Catalina || CSS || — || align=right | 2.7 km || 
|-id=719 bgcolor=#E9E9E9
| 70719 ||  || — || October 31, 1999 || Anderson Mesa || LONEOS || — || align=right | 2.4 km || 
|-id=720 bgcolor=#E9E9E9
| 70720 Davidskillman ||  ||  || October 31, 1999 || Catalina || CSS || HNS || align=right | 5.1 km || 
|-id=721 bgcolor=#E9E9E9
| 70721 || 1999 VD || — || November 1, 1999 || Lime Creek || R. Linderholm || — || align=right | 1.9 km || 
|-id=722 bgcolor=#E9E9E9
| 70722 || 1999 VY || — || November 1, 1999 || Ondřejov || L. Kotková || — || align=right | 1.9 km || 
|-id=723 bgcolor=#E9E9E9
| 70723 ||  || — || November 3, 1999 || Baton Rouge || W. R. Cooney Jr., P. M. Motl || — || align=right | 5.1 km || 
|-id=724 bgcolor=#E9E9E9
| 70724 ||  || — || November 4, 1999 || Fountain Hills || C. W. Juels || — || align=right | 4.2 km || 
|-id=725 bgcolor=#E9E9E9
| 70725 ||  || — || November 5, 1999 || Fountain Hills || C. W. Juels || — || align=right | 3.7 km || 
|-id=726 bgcolor=#E9E9E9
| 70726 ||  || — || November 1, 1999 || Bergisch Gladbach || W. Bickel || — || align=right | 2.3 km || 
|-id=727 bgcolor=#E9E9E9
| 70727 ||  || — || November 1, 1999 || Kitt Peak || Spacewatch || — || align=right | 3.1 km || 
|-id=728 bgcolor=#fefefe
| 70728 Gal-Edd ||  ||  || November 1, 1999 || Catalina || CSS || NYS || align=right | 2.1 km || 
|-id=729 bgcolor=#E9E9E9
| 70729 ||  || — || November 5, 1999 || Višnjan Observatory || K. Korlević || PAD || align=right | 5.4 km || 
|-id=730 bgcolor=#E9E9E9
| 70730 ||  || — || November 6, 1999 || Fountain Hills || C. W. Juels || RAF || align=right | 2.7 km || 
|-id=731 bgcolor=#E9E9E9
| 70731 ||  || — || November 5, 1999 || Oizumi || T. Kobayashi || — || align=right | 2.9 km || 
|-id=732 bgcolor=#E9E9E9
| 70732 ||  || — || November 5, 1999 || Oizumi || T. Kobayashi || — || align=right | 2.8 km || 
|-id=733 bgcolor=#fefefe
| 70733 ||  || — || November 8, 1999 || Zeno || T. Stafford || NYS || align=right | 2.7 km || 
|-id=734 bgcolor=#E9E9E9
| 70734 ||  || — || November 8, 1999 || Fountain Hills || C. W. Juels || — || align=right | 3.4 km || 
|-id=735 bgcolor=#E9E9E9
| 70735 ||  || — || November 9, 1999 || Fountain Hills || C. W. Juels || MIT || align=right | 7.2 km || 
|-id=736 bgcolor=#E9E9E9
| 70736 ||  || — || November 9, 1999 || Oizumi || T. Kobayashi || — || align=right | 5.0 km || 
|-id=737 bgcolor=#E9E9E9
| 70737 Stenflo ||  ||  || November 8, 1999 || Gnosca || S. Sposetti || — || align=right | 3.4 km || 
|-id=738 bgcolor=#E9E9E9
| 70738 ||  || — || November 8, 1999 || Višnjan Observatory || K. Korlević || — || align=right | 3.2 km || 
|-id=739 bgcolor=#E9E9E9
| 70739 ||  || — || November 2, 1999 || Kitt Peak || Spacewatch || — || align=right | 4.2 km || 
|-id=740 bgcolor=#E9E9E9
| 70740 ||  || — || November 2, 1999 || Kitt Peak || Spacewatch || — || align=right | 4.4 km || 
|-id=741 bgcolor=#E9E9E9
| 70741 ||  || — || November 2, 1999 || Kitt Peak || Spacewatch || — || align=right | 3.1 km || 
|-id=742 bgcolor=#E9E9E9
| 70742 ||  || — || November 8, 1999 || Višnjan Observatory || K. Korlević || — || align=right | 3.2 km || 
|-id=743 bgcolor=#E9E9E9
| 70743 ||  || — || November 9, 1999 || Višnjan Observatory || K. Korlević || — || align=right | 6.1 km || 
|-id=744 bgcolor=#fefefe
| 70744 Maffucci ||  ||  || November 9, 1999 || San Marcello || L. Tesi, G. Forti || — || align=right | 2.6 km || 
|-id=745 bgcolor=#E9E9E9
| 70745 Aleserpieri ||  ||  || November 9, 1999 || Pianoro || V. Goretti || — || align=right | 3.7 km || 
|-id=746 bgcolor=#E9E9E9
| 70746 ||  || — || November 13, 1999 || Fountain Hills || C. W. Juels || — || align=right | 4.7 km || 
|-id=747 bgcolor=#E9E9E9
| 70747 ||  || — || November 13, 1999 || Fountain Hills || C. W. Juels || — || align=right | 11 km || 
|-id=748 bgcolor=#E9E9E9
| 70748 ||  || — || November 13, 1999 || Goodricke-Pigott || R. A. Tucker || PAL || align=right | 6.8 km || 
|-id=749 bgcolor=#E9E9E9
| 70749 ||  || — || November 14, 1999 || Fountain Hills || C. W. Juels || — || align=right | 5.5 km || 
|-id=750 bgcolor=#fefefe
| 70750 ||  || — || November 15, 1999 || Fountain Hills || C. W. Juels || — || align=right | 5.2 km || 
|-id=751 bgcolor=#E9E9E9
| 70751 ||  || — || November 13, 1999 || Oizumi || T. Kobayashi || GEF || align=right | 5.2 km || 
|-id=752 bgcolor=#E9E9E9
| 70752 ||  || — || November 13, 1999 || Oizumi || T. Kobayashi || EUN || align=right | 3.4 km || 
|-id=753 bgcolor=#E9E9E9
| 70753 ||  || — || November 3, 1999 || Socorro || LINEAR || — || align=right | 3.7 km || 
|-id=754 bgcolor=#E9E9E9
| 70754 ||  || — || November 3, 1999 || Socorro || LINEAR || — || align=right | 3.6 km || 
|-id=755 bgcolor=#E9E9E9
| 70755 ||  || — || November 3, 1999 || Socorro || LINEAR || MIS || align=right | 5.3 km || 
|-id=756 bgcolor=#E9E9E9
| 70756 ||  || — || November 3, 1999 || Socorro || LINEAR || — || align=right | 7.2 km || 
|-id=757 bgcolor=#E9E9E9
| 70757 ||  || — || November 3, 1999 || Socorro || LINEAR || — || align=right | 4.1 km || 
|-id=758 bgcolor=#E9E9E9
| 70758 ||  || — || November 3, 1999 || Socorro || LINEAR || — || align=right | 5.8 km || 
|-id=759 bgcolor=#E9E9E9
| 70759 ||  || — || November 3, 1999 || Socorro || LINEAR || — || align=right | 4.2 km || 
|-id=760 bgcolor=#fefefe
| 70760 ||  || — || November 3, 1999 || Socorro || LINEAR || — || align=right | 3.9 km || 
|-id=761 bgcolor=#E9E9E9
| 70761 ||  || — || November 3, 1999 || Socorro || LINEAR || MAR || align=right | 2.7 km || 
|-id=762 bgcolor=#E9E9E9
| 70762 ||  || — || November 3, 1999 || Socorro || LINEAR || DOR || align=right | 7.1 km || 
|-id=763 bgcolor=#d6d6d6
| 70763 ||  || — || November 3, 1999 || Socorro || LINEAR || — || align=right | 5.9 km || 
|-id=764 bgcolor=#E9E9E9
| 70764 ||  || — || November 3, 1999 || Socorro || LINEAR || EUN || align=right | 2.6 km || 
|-id=765 bgcolor=#E9E9E9
| 70765 ||  || — || November 3, 1999 || Socorro || LINEAR || — || align=right | 4.6 km || 
|-id=766 bgcolor=#E9E9E9
| 70766 ||  || — || November 3, 1999 || Socorro || LINEAR || — || align=right | 4.7 km || 
|-id=767 bgcolor=#d6d6d6
| 70767 ||  || — || November 3, 1999 || Socorro || LINEAR || — || align=right | 7.9 km || 
|-id=768 bgcolor=#E9E9E9
| 70768 ||  || — || November 3, 1999 || Socorro || LINEAR || MAR || align=right | 4.3 km || 
|-id=769 bgcolor=#E9E9E9
| 70769 ||  || — || November 3, 1999 || Socorro || LINEAR || — || align=right | 3.4 km || 
|-id=770 bgcolor=#E9E9E9
| 70770 ||  || — || November 3, 1999 || Socorro || LINEAR || — || align=right | 3.4 km || 
|-id=771 bgcolor=#E9E9E9
| 70771 ||  || — || November 3, 1999 || Socorro || LINEAR || — || align=right | 5.9 km || 
|-id=772 bgcolor=#E9E9E9
| 70772 ||  || — || November 3, 1999 || Socorro || LINEAR || — || align=right | 2.5 km || 
|-id=773 bgcolor=#E9E9E9
| 70773 ||  || — || November 3, 1999 || Socorro || LINEAR || MRX || align=right | 2.6 km || 
|-id=774 bgcolor=#d6d6d6
| 70774 ||  || — || November 3, 1999 || Socorro || LINEAR || — || align=right | 9.5 km || 
|-id=775 bgcolor=#E9E9E9
| 70775 ||  || — || November 10, 1999 || Socorro || LINEAR || — || align=right | 2.7 km || 
|-id=776 bgcolor=#E9E9E9
| 70776 ||  || — || November 10, 1999 || Socorro || LINEAR || — || align=right | 5.1 km || 
|-id=777 bgcolor=#d6d6d6
| 70777 ||  || — || November 15, 1999 || Bergisch Gladbach || W. Bickel || KOR || align=right | 4.5 km || 
|-id=778 bgcolor=#E9E9E9
| 70778 ||  || — || November 5, 1999 || Uenohara || N. Kawasato || — || align=right | 3.0 km || 
|-id=779 bgcolor=#E9E9E9
| 70779 ||  || — || November 4, 1999 || Kitt Peak || Spacewatch || — || align=right | 4.0 km || 
|-id=780 bgcolor=#E9E9E9
| 70780 ||  || — || November 4, 1999 || Kitt Peak || Spacewatch || HEN || align=right | 6.2 km || 
|-id=781 bgcolor=#E9E9E9
| 70781 Donnelly ||  ||  || November 1, 1999 || Catalina || CSS || — || align=right | 3.4 km || 
|-id=782 bgcolor=#E9E9E9
| 70782 Vinceelliott ||  ||  || November 1, 1999 || Catalina || CSS || — || align=right | 4.9 km || 
|-id=783 bgcolor=#E9E9E9
| 70783 Kenwilliams ||  ||  || November 3, 1999 || Catalina || CSS || — || align=right | 6.4 km || 
|-id=784 bgcolor=#fefefe
| 70784 ||  || — || November 4, 1999 || Catalina || CSS || — || align=right | 2.0 km || 
|-id=785 bgcolor=#fefefe
| 70785 ||  || — || November 4, 1999 || Socorro || LINEAR || PHO || align=right | 3.1 km || 
|-id=786 bgcolor=#E9E9E9
| 70786 ||  || — || November 4, 1999 || Socorro || LINEAR || — || align=right | 8.1 km || 
|-id=787 bgcolor=#E9E9E9
| 70787 ||  || — || November 4, 1999 || Socorro || LINEAR || EUN || align=right | 3.9 km || 
|-id=788 bgcolor=#E9E9E9
| 70788 ||  || — || November 3, 1999 || Socorro || LINEAR || — || align=right | 6.2 km || 
|-id=789 bgcolor=#E9E9E9
| 70789 ||  || — || November 3, 1999 || Socorro || LINEAR || MAR || align=right | 3.7 km || 
|-id=790 bgcolor=#E9E9E9
| 70790 ||  || — || November 3, 1999 || Socorro || LINEAR || — || align=right | 3.3 km || 
|-id=791 bgcolor=#E9E9E9
| 70791 ||  || — || November 3, 1999 || Socorro || LINEAR || — || align=right | 2.0 km || 
|-id=792 bgcolor=#E9E9E9
| 70792 ||  || — || November 3, 1999 || Socorro || LINEAR || — || align=right | 3.5 km || 
|-id=793 bgcolor=#E9E9E9
| 70793 ||  || — || November 3, 1999 || Socorro || LINEAR || — || align=right | 7.5 km || 
|-id=794 bgcolor=#E9E9E9
| 70794 ||  || — || November 3, 1999 || Socorro || LINEAR || — || align=right | 3.7 km || 
|-id=795 bgcolor=#E9E9E9
| 70795 ||  || — || November 3, 1999 || Socorro || LINEAR || — || align=right | 3.2 km || 
|-id=796 bgcolor=#E9E9E9
| 70796 ||  || — || November 4, 1999 || Socorro || LINEAR || — || align=right | 2.8 km || 
|-id=797 bgcolor=#E9E9E9
| 70797 ||  || — || November 4, 1999 || Socorro || LINEAR || — || align=right | 2.0 km || 
|-id=798 bgcolor=#E9E9E9
| 70798 ||  || — || November 4, 1999 || Socorro || LINEAR || — || align=right | 4.7 km || 
|-id=799 bgcolor=#E9E9E9
| 70799 ||  || — || November 4, 1999 || Socorro || LINEAR || — || align=right | 2.4 km || 
|-id=800 bgcolor=#E9E9E9
| 70800 ||  || — || November 4, 1999 || Socorro || LINEAR || — || align=right | 7.7 km || 
|}

70801–70900 

|-bgcolor=#fefefe
| 70801 ||  || — || November 4, 1999 || Socorro || LINEAR || NYS || align=right | 2.2 km || 
|-id=802 bgcolor=#d6d6d6
| 70802 ||  || — || November 4, 1999 || Socorro || LINEAR || 628 || align=right | 3.8 km || 
|-id=803 bgcolor=#E9E9E9
| 70803 ||  || — || November 4, 1999 || Socorro || LINEAR || NEM || align=right | 5.6 km || 
|-id=804 bgcolor=#E9E9E9
| 70804 ||  || — || November 4, 1999 || Socorro || LINEAR || — || align=right | 3.8 km || 
|-id=805 bgcolor=#E9E9E9
| 70805 ||  || — || November 4, 1999 || Socorro || LINEAR || — || align=right | 3.2 km || 
|-id=806 bgcolor=#E9E9E9
| 70806 ||  || — || November 4, 1999 || Socorro || LINEAR || — || align=right | 4.6 km || 
|-id=807 bgcolor=#E9E9E9
| 70807 ||  || — || November 4, 1999 || Socorro || LINEAR || — || align=right | 3.0 km || 
|-id=808 bgcolor=#E9E9E9
| 70808 ||  || — || November 4, 1999 || Socorro || LINEAR || GEF || align=right | 3.2 km || 
|-id=809 bgcolor=#E9E9E9
| 70809 ||  || — || November 4, 1999 || Socorro || LINEAR || — || align=right | 2.2 km || 
|-id=810 bgcolor=#E9E9E9
| 70810 ||  || — || November 4, 1999 || Socorro || LINEAR || — || align=right | 3.6 km || 
|-id=811 bgcolor=#E9E9E9
| 70811 ||  || — || November 4, 1999 || Socorro || LINEAR || — || align=right | 5.1 km || 
|-id=812 bgcolor=#E9E9E9
| 70812 ||  || — || November 4, 1999 || Socorro || LINEAR || — || align=right | 3.4 km || 
|-id=813 bgcolor=#E9E9E9
| 70813 ||  || — || November 4, 1999 || Socorro || LINEAR || — || align=right | 5.9 km || 
|-id=814 bgcolor=#E9E9E9
| 70814 ||  || — || November 4, 1999 || Socorro || LINEAR || — || align=right | 2.2 km || 
|-id=815 bgcolor=#E9E9E9
| 70815 ||  || — || November 15, 1999 || Ondřejov || P. Pravec || — || align=right | 6.8 km || 
|-id=816 bgcolor=#E9E9E9
| 70816 ||  || — || November 1, 1999 || Kitt Peak || Spacewatch || — || align=right | 2.2 km || 
|-id=817 bgcolor=#E9E9E9
| 70817 ||  || — || November 5, 1999 || Kitt Peak || Spacewatch || AGN || align=right | 2.0 km || 
|-id=818 bgcolor=#E9E9E9
| 70818 ||  || — || November 3, 1999 || Socorro || LINEAR || — || align=right | 2.8 km || 
|-id=819 bgcolor=#E9E9E9
| 70819 ||  || — || November 3, 1999 || Socorro || LINEAR || MAR || align=right | 3.8 km || 
|-id=820 bgcolor=#E9E9E9
| 70820 ||  || — || November 4, 1999 || Socorro || LINEAR || — || align=right | 2.3 km || 
|-id=821 bgcolor=#fefefe
| 70821 ||  || — || November 4, 1999 || Socorro || LINEAR || — || align=right | 2.3 km || 
|-id=822 bgcolor=#E9E9E9
| 70822 ||  || — || November 4, 1999 || Socorro || LINEAR || EUN || align=right | 2.8 km || 
|-id=823 bgcolor=#E9E9E9
| 70823 ||  || — || November 4, 1999 || Socorro || LINEAR || AGN || align=right | 3.2 km || 
|-id=824 bgcolor=#E9E9E9
| 70824 ||  || — || November 4, 1999 || Socorro || LINEAR || — || align=right | 6.1 km || 
|-id=825 bgcolor=#E9E9E9
| 70825 ||  || — || November 5, 1999 || Socorro || LINEAR || — || align=right | 6.2 km || 
|-id=826 bgcolor=#E9E9E9
| 70826 ||  || — || November 5, 1999 || Socorro || LINEAR || — || align=right | 2.5 km || 
|-id=827 bgcolor=#E9E9E9
| 70827 ||  || — || November 5, 1999 || Socorro || LINEAR || EUN || align=right | 2.2 km || 
|-id=828 bgcolor=#E9E9E9
| 70828 ||  || — || November 4, 1999 || Socorro || LINEAR || — || align=right | 1.8 km || 
|-id=829 bgcolor=#E9E9E9
| 70829 ||  || — || November 7, 1999 || Socorro || LINEAR || EUN || align=right | 4.5 km || 
|-id=830 bgcolor=#E9E9E9
| 70830 ||  || — || November 7, 1999 || Socorro || LINEAR || MAR || align=right | 3.5 km || 
|-id=831 bgcolor=#E9E9E9
| 70831 ||  || — || November 4, 1999 || Socorro || LINEAR || — || align=right | 3.6 km || 
|-id=832 bgcolor=#E9E9E9
| 70832 ||  || — || November 5, 1999 || Socorro || LINEAR || MAR || align=right | 2.1 km || 
|-id=833 bgcolor=#fefefe
| 70833 ||  || — || November 5, 1999 || Socorro || LINEAR || — || align=right | 2.6 km || 
|-id=834 bgcolor=#E9E9E9
| 70834 ||  || — || November 5, 1999 || Socorro || LINEAR || — || align=right | 5.2 km || 
|-id=835 bgcolor=#E9E9E9
| 70835 ||  || — || November 5, 1999 || Socorro || LINEAR || — || align=right | 4.5 km || 
|-id=836 bgcolor=#E9E9E9
| 70836 ||  || — || November 9, 1999 || Socorro || LINEAR || — || align=right | 2.5 km || 
|-id=837 bgcolor=#E9E9E9
| 70837 ||  || — || November 9, 1999 || Socorro || LINEAR || — || align=right | 1.7 km || 
|-id=838 bgcolor=#E9E9E9
| 70838 ||  || — || November 9, 1999 || Socorro || LINEAR || — || align=right | 1.9 km || 
|-id=839 bgcolor=#E9E9E9
| 70839 ||  || — || November 9, 1999 || Socorro || LINEAR || — || align=right | 2.5 km || 
|-id=840 bgcolor=#E9E9E9
| 70840 ||  || — || November 9, 1999 || Socorro || LINEAR || — || align=right | 3.1 km || 
|-id=841 bgcolor=#E9E9E9
| 70841 ||  || — || November 9, 1999 || Socorro || LINEAR || KRM || align=right | 5.7 km || 
|-id=842 bgcolor=#E9E9E9
| 70842 ||  || — || November 9, 1999 || Socorro || LINEAR || — || align=right | 6.4 km || 
|-id=843 bgcolor=#E9E9E9
| 70843 ||  || — || November 9, 1999 || Socorro || LINEAR || — || align=right | 2.6 km || 
|-id=844 bgcolor=#E9E9E9
| 70844 ||  || — || November 9, 1999 || Socorro || LINEAR || — || align=right | 3.9 km || 
|-id=845 bgcolor=#E9E9E9
| 70845 ||  || — || November 9, 1999 || Socorro || LINEAR || — || align=right | 2.7 km || 
|-id=846 bgcolor=#E9E9E9
| 70846 ||  || — || November 9, 1999 || Socorro || LINEAR || — || align=right | 2.5 km || 
|-id=847 bgcolor=#E9E9E9
| 70847 ||  || — || November 9, 1999 || Socorro || LINEAR || — || align=right | 2.6 km || 
|-id=848 bgcolor=#d6d6d6
| 70848 ||  || — || November 9, 1999 || Socorro || LINEAR || — || align=right | 7.3 km || 
|-id=849 bgcolor=#d6d6d6
| 70849 ||  || — || November 9, 1999 || Socorro || LINEAR || KOR || align=right | 3.5 km || 
|-id=850 bgcolor=#E9E9E9
| 70850 Schur ||  ||  || November 4, 1999 || Catalina || CSS || PAD || align=right | 5.9 km || 
|-id=851 bgcolor=#fefefe
| 70851 ||  || — || November 9, 1999 || Catalina || CSS || — || align=right | 2.5 km || 
|-id=852 bgcolor=#E9E9E9
| 70852 ||  || — || November 9, 1999 || Catalina || CSS || EUN || align=right | 2.5 km || 
|-id=853 bgcolor=#E9E9E9
| 70853 ||  || — || November 9, 1999 || Catalina || CSS || — || align=right | 3.1 km || 
|-id=854 bgcolor=#E9E9E9
| 70854 ||  || — || November 4, 1999 || Kitt Peak || Spacewatch || HEN || align=right | 2.0 km || 
|-id=855 bgcolor=#E9E9E9
| 70855 ||  || — || November 9, 1999 || Kitt Peak || Spacewatch || — || align=right | 1.7 km || 
|-id=856 bgcolor=#E9E9E9
| 70856 ||  || — || November 4, 1999 || Kitt Peak || Spacewatch || 526 || align=right | 5.1 km || 
|-id=857 bgcolor=#E9E9E9
| 70857 ||  || — || November 4, 1999 || Kitt Peak || Spacewatch || — || align=right | 2.6 km || 
|-id=858 bgcolor=#E9E9E9
| 70858 ||  || — || November 9, 1999 || Kitt Peak || Spacewatch || fast? || align=right | 2.9 km || 
|-id=859 bgcolor=#E9E9E9
| 70859 ||  || — || November 9, 1999 || Kitt Peak || Spacewatch || — || align=right | 4.5 km || 
|-id=860 bgcolor=#E9E9E9
| 70860 ||  || — || November 10, 1999 || Kitt Peak || Spacewatch || — || align=right | 5.1 km || 
|-id=861 bgcolor=#E9E9E9
| 70861 ||  || — || November 10, 1999 || Kitt Peak || Spacewatch || — || align=right | 2.4 km || 
|-id=862 bgcolor=#E9E9E9
| 70862 ||  || — || November 10, 1999 || Kitt Peak || Spacewatch || — || align=right | 2.6 km || 
|-id=863 bgcolor=#E9E9E9
| 70863 ||  || — || November 11, 1999 || Catalina || CSS || — || align=right | 4.6 km || 
|-id=864 bgcolor=#fefefe
| 70864 ||  || — || November 12, 1999 || Socorro || LINEAR || — || align=right | 2.6 km || 
|-id=865 bgcolor=#E9E9E9
| 70865 ||  || — || November 14, 1999 || Socorro || LINEAR || — || align=right | 2.1 km || 
|-id=866 bgcolor=#E9E9E9
| 70866 ||  || — || November 14, 1999 || Socorro || LINEAR || HOF || align=right | 5.2 km || 
|-id=867 bgcolor=#E9E9E9
| 70867 ||  || — || November 14, 1999 || Socorro || LINEAR || — || align=right | 5.7 km || 
|-id=868 bgcolor=#E9E9E9
| 70868 ||  || — || November 14, 1999 || Socorro || LINEAR || — || align=right | 2.3 km || 
|-id=869 bgcolor=#E9E9E9
| 70869 ||  || — || November 12, 1999 || Kitt Peak || Spacewatch || — || align=right | 3.2 km || 
|-id=870 bgcolor=#E9E9E9
| 70870 ||  || — || November 12, 1999 || Socorro || LINEAR || GEF || align=right | 3.0 km || 
|-id=871 bgcolor=#E9E9E9
| 70871 ||  || — || November 12, 1999 || Socorro || LINEAR || — || align=right | 5.0 km || 
|-id=872 bgcolor=#fefefe
| 70872 ||  || — || November 14, 1999 || Socorro || LINEAR || — || align=right | 2.4 km || 
|-id=873 bgcolor=#d6d6d6
| 70873 ||  || — || November 14, 1999 || Socorro || LINEAR || KOR || align=right | 3.0 km || 
|-id=874 bgcolor=#E9E9E9
| 70874 ||  || — || November 14, 1999 || Socorro || LINEAR || MAR || align=right | 3.0 km || 
|-id=875 bgcolor=#E9E9E9
| 70875 ||  || — || November 14, 1999 || Socorro || LINEAR || — || align=right | 3.3 km || 
|-id=876 bgcolor=#fefefe
| 70876 ||  || — || November 14, 1999 || Socorro || LINEAR || — || align=right | 4.7 km || 
|-id=877 bgcolor=#E9E9E9
| 70877 ||  || — || November 14, 1999 || Socorro || LINEAR || BRG || align=right | 4.2 km || 
|-id=878 bgcolor=#E9E9E9
| 70878 ||  || — || November 14, 1999 || Socorro || LINEAR || HEN || align=right | 2.0 km || 
|-id=879 bgcolor=#E9E9E9
| 70879 ||  || — || November 14, 1999 || Socorro || LINEAR || PAD || align=right | 5.3 km || 
|-id=880 bgcolor=#E9E9E9
| 70880 ||  || — || November 14, 1999 || Socorro || LINEAR || — || align=right | 3.2 km || 
|-id=881 bgcolor=#E9E9E9
| 70881 ||  || — || November 14, 1999 || Socorro || LINEAR || MRX || align=right | 2.8 km || 
|-id=882 bgcolor=#E9E9E9
| 70882 ||  || — || November 14, 1999 || Socorro || LINEAR || — || align=right | 3.4 km || 
|-id=883 bgcolor=#E9E9E9
| 70883 ||  || — || November 14, 1999 || Socorro || LINEAR || — || align=right | 1.9 km || 
|-id=884 bgcolor=#E9E9E9
| 70884 ||  || — || November 14, 1999 || Socorro || LINEAR || — || align=right | 2.6 km || 
|-id=885 bgcolor=#E9E9E9
| 70885 ||  || — || November 14, 1999 || Socorro || LINEAR || — || align=right | 2.8 km || 
|-id=886 bgcolor=#E9E9E9
| 70886 ||  || — || November 14, 1999 || Socorro || LINEAR || HEN || align=right | 2.7 km || 
|-id=887 bgcolor=#E9E9E9
| 70887 ||  || — || November 14, 1999 || Socorro || LINEAR || — || align=right | 6.0 km || 
|-id=888 bgcolor=#E9E9E9
| 70888 ||  || — || November 14, 1999 || Socorro || LINEAR || — || align=right | 3.7 km || 
|-id=889 bgcolor=#E9E9E9
| 70889 ||  || — || November 14, 1999 || Socorro || LINEAR || — || align=right | 5.7 km || 
|-id=890 bgcolor=#fefefe
| 70890 ||  || — || November 14, 1999 || Socorro || LINEAR || NYS || align=right | 2.5 km || 
|-id=891 bgcolor=#E9E9E9
| 70891 ||  || — || November 14, 1999 || Socorro || LINEAR || MAR || align=right | 2.2 km || 
|-id=892 bgcolor=#E9E9E9
| 70892 ||  || — || November 14, 1999 || Socorro || LINEAR || GEF || align=right | 2.7 km || 
|-id=893 bgcolor=#E9E9E9
| 70893 ||  || — || November 14, 1999 || Socorro || LINEAR || — || align=right | 3.4 km || 
|-id=894 bgcolor=#E9E9E9
| 70894 ||  || — || November 14, 1999 || Socorro || LINEAR || — || align=right | 5.5 km || 
|-id=895 bgcolor=#d6d6d6
| 70895 ||  || — || November 14, 1999 || Socorro || LINEAR || — || align=right | 4.6 km || 
|-id=896 bgcolor=#E9E9E9
| 70896 ||  || — || November 14, 1999 || Socorro || LINEAR || — || align=right | 2.8 km || 
|-id=897 bgcolor=#d6d6d6
| 70897 ||  || — || November 5, 1999 || Anderson Mesa || LONEOS || — || align=right | 14 km || 
|-id=898 bgcolor=#E9E9E9
| 70898 ||  || — || November 5, 1999 || Socorro || LINEAR || — || align=right | 3.5 km || 
|-id=899 bgcolor=#fefefe
| 70899 ||  || — || November 5, 1999 || Socorro || LINEAR || — || align=right | 3.2 km || 
|-id=900 bgcolor=#E9E9E9
| 70900 ||  || — || November 5, 1999 || Socorro || LINEAR || HNS || align=right | 3.4 km || 
|}

70901–71000 

|-bgcolor=#fefefe
| 70901 ||  || — || November 6, 1999 || Socorro || LINEAR || — || align=right | 2.2 km || 
|-id=902 bgcolor=#fefefe
| 70902 ||  || — || November 6, 1999 || Socorro || LINEAR || — || align=right | 2.6 km || 
|-id=903 bgcolor=#E9E9E9
| 70903 ||  || — || November 6, 1999 || Socorro || LINEAR || EUN || align=right | 3.4 km || 
|-id=904 bgcolor=#E9E9E9
| 70904 ||  || — || November 15, 1999 || Socorro || LINEAR || — || align=right | 3.6 km || 
|-id=905 bgcolor=#d6d6d6
| 70905 ||  || — || November 15, 1999 || Socorro || LINEAR || — || align=right | 7.8 km || 
|-id=906 bgcolor=#E9E9E9
| 70906 ||  || — || November 15, 1999 || Socorro || LINEAR || — || align=right | 2.1 km || 
|-id=907 bgcolor=#E9E9E9
| 70907 ||  || — || November 15, 1999 || Socorro || LINEAR || HOF || align=right | 5.1 km || 
|-id=908 bgcolor=#E9E9E9
| 70908 ||  || — || November 15, 1999 || Socorro || LINEAR || — || align=right | 2.9 km || 
|-id=909 bgcolor=#E9E9E9
| 70909 ||  || — || November 15, 1999 || Socorro || LINEAR || MAR || align=right | 6.2 km || 
|-id=910 bgcolor=#E9E9E9
| 70910 ||  || — || November 15, 1999 || Socorro || LINEAR || — || align=right | 3.8 km || 
|-id=911 bgcolor=#E9E9E9
| 70911 ||  || — || November 15, 1999 || Socorro || LINEAR || — || align=right | 3.3 km || 
|-id=912 bgcolor=#E9E9E9
| 70912 ||  || — || November 15, 1999 || Socorro || LINEAR || — || align=right | 2.1 km || 
|-id=913 bgcolor=#E9E9E9
| 70913 ||  || — || November 15, 1999 || Socorro || LINEAR || HEN || align=right | 2.3 km || 
|-id=914 bgcolor=#E9E9E9
| 70914 ||  || — || November 3, 1999 || Socorro || LINEAR || — || align=right | 2.2 km || 
|-id=915 bgcolor=#E9E9E9
| 70915 ||  || — || November 1, 1999 || Catalina || CSS || — || align=right | 2.3 km || 
|-id=916 bgcolor=#E9E9E9
| 70916 ||  || — || November 3, 1999 || Catalina || CSS || — || align=right | 3.2 km || 
|-id=917 bgcolor=#E9E9E9
| 70917 ||  || — || November 3, 1999 || Catalina || CSS || PAD || align=right | 5.3 km || 
|-id=918 bgcolor=#fefefe
| 70918 ||  || — || November 4, 1999 || Catalina || CSS || V || align=right | 2.0 km || 
|-id=919 bgcolor=#fefefe
| 70919 ||  || — || November 4, 1999 || Catalina || CSS || V || align=right | 1.7 km || 
|-id=920 bgcolor=#E9E9E9
| 70920 ||  || — || November 4, 1999 || Anderson Mesa || LONEOS || — || align=right | 3.2 km || 
|-id=921 bgcolor=#E9E9E9
| 70921 ||  || — || November 1, 1999 || Catalina || CSS || — || align=right | 5.3 km || 
|-id=922 bgcolor=#E9E9E9
| 70922 ||  || — || November 1, 1999 || Catalina || CSS || — || align=right | 2.3 km || 
|-id=923 bgcolor=#E9E9E9
| 70923 ||  || — || November 3, 1999 || Catalina || CSS || — || align=right | 4.0 km || 
|-id=924 bgcolor=#E9E9E9
| 70924 ||  || — || November 10, 1999 || Kitt Peak || Spacewatch || — || align=right | 2.6 km || 
|-id=925 bgcolor=#E9E9E9
| 70925 ||  || — || November 7, 1999 || Socorro || LINEAR || — || align=right | 3.6 km || 
|-id=926 bgcolor=#E9E9E9
| 70926 ||  || — || November 9, 1999 || Kitt Peak || Spacewatch || — || align=right | 3.0 km || 
|-id=927 bgcolor=#E9E9E9
| 70927 ||  || — || November 13, 1999 || Catalina || CSS || — || align=right | 3.5 km || 
|-id=928 bgcolor=#E9E9E9
| 70928 ||  || — || November 12, 1999 || Socorro || LINEAR || HOF || align=right | 5.3 km || 
|-id=929 bgcolor=#E9E9E9
| 70929 ||  || — || November 3, 1999 || Socorro || LINEAR || — || align=right | 2.1 km || 
|-id=930 bgcolor=#E9E9E9
| 70930 ||  || — || November 1, 1999 || Kitt Peak || Spacewatch || — || align=right | 1.8 km || 
|-id=931 bgcolor=#E9E9E9
| 70931 ||  || — || November 5, 1999 || Socorro || LINEAR || — || align=right | 3.4 km || 
|-id=932 bgcolor=#E9E9E9
| 70932 ||  || — || November 5, 1999 || Socorro || LINEAR || GEF || align=right | 3.5 km || 
|-id=933 bgcolor=#E9E9E9
| 70933 ||  || — || November 5, 1999 || Socorro || LINEAR || — || align=right | 2.0 km || 
|-id=934 bgcolor=#E9E9E9
| 70934 ||  || — || November 5, 1999 || Socorro || LINEAR || — || align=right | 2.4 km || 
|-id=935 bgcolor=#E9E9E9
| 70935 || 1999 WG || — || November 16, 1999 || Oizumi || T. Kobayashi || — || align=right | 3.9 km || 
|-id=936 bgcolor=#E9E9E9
| 70936 Kámen ||  ||  || November 28, 1999 || Kleť || J. Tichá, M. Tichý || — || align=right | 6.9 km || 
|-id=937 bgcolor=#E9E9E9
| 70937 ||  || — || November 29, 1999 || Kleť || Kleť Obs. || — || align=right | 3.4 km || 
|-id=938 bgcolor=#d6d6d6
| 70938 ||  || — || November 28, 1999 || Oizumi || T. Kobayashi || KOR || align=right | 4.9 km || 
|-id=939 bgcolor=#E9E9E9
| 70939 ||  || — || November 29, 1999 || Kitt Peak || Spacewatch || — || align=right | 1.9 km || 
|-id=940 bgcolor=#fefefe
| 70940 ||  || — || November 29, 1999 || Kitt Peak || Spacewatch || V || align=right | 2.2 km || 
|-id=941 bgcolor=#E9E9E9
| 70941 ||  || — || November 28, 1999 || Višnjan Observatory || K. Korlević || — || align=right | 3.2 km || 
|-id=942 bgcolor=#E9E9E9
| 70942 Vandanashiva ||  ||  || November 28, 1999 || Gnosca || S. Sposetti || — || align=right | 2.4 km || 
|-id=943 bgcolor=#E9E9E9
| 70943 ||  || — || November 29, 1999 || Farra d'Isonzo || Farra d'Isonzo || WIT || align=right | 2.0 km || 
|-id=944 bgcolor=#E9E9E9
| 70944 ||  || — || November 30, 1999 || Oizumi || T. Kobayashi || — || align=right | 5.1 km || 
|-id=945 bgcolor=#d6d6d6
| 70945 ||  || — || November 30, 1999 || Oizumi || T. Kobayashi || — || align=right | 3.5 km || 
|-id=946 bgcolor=#E9E9E9
| 70946 ||  || — || November 30, 1999 || Oizumi || T. Kobayashi || — || align=right | 4.9 km || 
|-id=947 bgcolor=#E9E9E9
| 70947 ||  || — || November 28, 1999 || Kitt Peak || Spacewatch || — || align=right | 2.3 km || 
|-id=948 bgcolor=#E9E9E9
| 70948 ||  || — || November 30, 1999 || Kitt Peak || Spacewatch || — || align=right | 2.2 km || 
|-id=949 bgcolor=#E9E9E9
| 70949 ||  || — || November 30, 1999 || Kitt Peak || Spacewatch || — || align=right | 4.1 km || 
|-id=950 bgcolor=#E9E9E9
| 70950 ||  || — || November 30, 1999 || Kitt Peak || Spacewatch || — || align=right | 2.3 km || 
|-id=951 bgcolor=#E9E9E9
| 70951 ||  || — || November 17, 1999 || Kitt Peak || Spacewatch || — || align=right | 5.4 km || 
|-id=952 bgcolor=#E9E9E9
| 70952 || 1999 XE || — || December 2, 1999 || Kitt Peak || Spacewatch || — || align=right | 3.0 km || 
|-id=953 bgcolor=#E9E9E9
| 70953 ||  || — || December 3, 1999 || Fountain Hills || C. W. Juels || GER || align=right | 3.3 km || 
|-id=954 bgcolor=#d6d6d6
| 70954 ||  || — || December 2, 1999 || Kitt Peak || Spacewatch || THM || align=right | 6.8 km || 
|-id=955 bgcolor=#E9E9E9
| 70955 ||  || — || December 4, 1999 || Catalina || CSS || EUN || align=right | 2.5 km || 
|-id=956 bgcolor=#E9E9E9
| 70956 ||  || — || December 4, 1999 || Catalina || CSS || — || align=right | 2.9 km || 
|-id=957 bgcolor=#E9E9E9
| 70957 ||  || — || December 7, 1999 || Oaxaca || J. M. Roe || — || align=right | 7.6 km || 
|-id=958 bgcolor=#E9E9E9
| 70958 ||  || — || December 4, 1999 || Catalina || CSS || — || align=right | 4.7 km || 
|-id=959 bgcolor=#E9E9E9
| 70959 ||  || — || December 4, 1999 || Catalina || CSS || MIS || align=right | 4.8 km || 
|-id=960 bgcolor=#E9E9E9
| 70960 ||  || — || December 4, 1999 || Catalina || CSS || EUN || align=right | 3.7 km || 
|-id=961 bgcolor=#fefefe
| 70961 ||  || — || December 3, 1999 || Socorro || LINEAR || — || align=right | 5.1 km || 
|-id=962 bgcolor=#E9E9E9
| 70962 ||  || — || December 2, 1999 || Kitt Peak || Spacewatch || — || align=right | 4.8 km || 
|-id=963 bgcolor=#E9E9E9
| 70963 ||  || — || December 5, 1999 || Catalina || CSS || — || align=right | 2.8 km || 
|-id=964 bgcolor=#E9E9E9
| 70964 ||  || — || December 5, 1999 || Socorro || LINEAR || EUN || align=right | 3.4 km || 
|-id=965 bgcolor=#E9E9E9
| 70965 ||  || — || December 5, 1999 || Socorro || LINEAR || — || align=right | 2.5 km || 
|-id=966 bgcolor=#E9E9E9
| 70966 ||  || — || December 3, 1999 || Socorro || LINEAR || — || align=right | 3.1 km || 
|-id=967 bgcolor=#fefefe
| 70967 ||  || — || December 3, 1999 || Socorro || LINEAR || — || align=right | 2.5 km || 
|-id=968 bgcolor=#E9E9E9
| 70968 ||  || — || December 5, 1999 || Socorro || LINEAR || — || align=right | 4.0 km || 
|-id=969 bgcolor=#E9E9E9
| 70969 ||  || — || December 5, 1999 || Socorro || LINEAR || EUN || align=right | 3.1 km || 
|-id=970 bgcolor=#E9E9E9
| 70970 ||  || — || December 5, 1999 || Socorro || LINEAR || — || align=right | 4.5 km || 
|-id=971 bgcolor=#fefefe
| 70971 ||  || — || December 5, 1999 || Socorro || LINEAR || NYS || align=right | 2.4 km || 
|-id=972 bgcolor=#fefefe
| 70972 ||  || — || December 5, 1999 || Socorro || LINEAR || V || align=right | 2.5 km || 
|-id=973 bgcolor=#fefefe
| 70973 ||  || — || December 5, 1999 || Socorro || LINEAR || — || align=right | 3.3 km || 
|-id=974 bgcolor=#E9E9E9
| 70974 ||  || — || December 6, 1999 || Socorro || LINEAR || — || align=right | 3.2 km || 
|-id=975 bgcolor=#E9E9E9
| 70975 ||  || — || December 6, 1999 || Socorro || LINEAR || — || align=right | 2.8 km || 
|-id=976 bgcolor=#E9E9E9
| 70976 ||  || — || December 6, 1999 || Socorro || LINEAR || — || align=right | 2.8 km || 
|-id=977 bgcolor=#E9E9E9
| 70977 ||  || — || December 6, 1999 || Socorro || LINEAR || — || align=right | 3.2 km || 
|-id=978 bgcolor=#E9E9E9
| 70978 ||  || — || December 6, 1999 || Socorro || LINEAR || — || align=right | 3.6 km || 
|-id=979 bgcolor=#E9E9E9
| 70979 ||  || — || December 6, 1999 || Socorro || LINEAR || — || align=right | 6.2 km || 
|-id=980 bgcolor=#fefefe
| 70980 ||  || — || December 6, 1999 || Socorro || LINEAR || — || align=right | 5.3 km || 
|-id=981 bgcolor=#E9E9E9
| 70981 ||  || — || December 6, 1999 || Socorro || LINEAR || HEN || align=right | 3.3 km || 
|-id=982 bgcolor=#E9E9E9
| 70982 ||  || — || December 6, 1999 || Socorro || LINEAR || — || align=right | 3.6 km || 
|-id=983 bgcolor=#d6d6d6
| 70983 ||  || — || December 6, 1999 || Socorro || LINEAR || CHA || align=right | 4.7 km || 
|-id=984 bgcolor=#E9E9E9
| 70984 ||  || — || December 6, 1999 || Socorro || LINEAR || — || align=right | 2.0 km || 
|-id=985 bgcolor=#E9E9E9
| 70985 ||  || — || December 6, 1999 || Socorro || LINEAR || — || align=right | 3.6 km || 
|-id=986 bgcolor=#E9E9E9
| 70986 ||  || — || December 6, 1999 || Socorro || LINEAR || — || align=right | 2.8 km || 
|-id=987 bgcolor=#E9E9E9
| 70987 ||  || — || December 6, 1999 || Socorro || LINEAR || — || align=right | 4.6 km || 
|-id=988 bgcolor=#E9E9E9
| 70988 ||  || — || December 6, 1999 || Socorro || LINEAR || — || align=right | 3.1 km || 
|-id=989 bgcolor=#d6d6d6
| 70989 ||  || — || December 6, 1999 || Socorro || LINEAR || YAK || align=right | 6.6 km || 
|-id=990 bgcolor=#d6d6d6
| 70990 ||  || — || December 6, 1999 || Socorro || LINEAR || — || align=right | 4.9 km || 
|-id=991 bgcolor=#E9E9E9
| 70991 ||  || — || December 6, 1999 || Socorro || LINEAR || — || align=right | 4.3 km || 
|-id=992 bgcolor=#E9E9E9
| 70992 ||  || — || December 6, 1999 || Socorro || LINEAR || HNS || align=right | 4.4 km || 
|-id=993 bgcolor=#E9E9E9
| 70993 ||  || — || December 6, 1999 || Socorro || LINEAR || — || align=right | 4.5 km || 
|-id=994 bgcolor=#E9E9E9
| 70994 ||  || — || December 7, 1999 || Socorro || LINEAR || — || align=right | 3.2 km || 
|-id=995 bgcolor=#E9E9E9
| 70995 Mikemorton ||  ||  || December 6, 1999 || Needville || Needville Obs. || — || align=right | 5.6 km || 
|-id=996 bgcolor=#E9E9E9
| 70996 ||  || — || December 6, 1999 || Oizumi || T. Kobayashi || — || align=right | 5.6 km || 
|-id=997 bgcolor=#d6d6d6
| 70997 ||  || — || December 6, 1999 || Oizumi || T. Kobayashi || — || align=right | 6.2 km || 
|-id=998 bgcolor=#d6d6d6
| 70998 ||  || — || December 6, 1999 || Oizumi || T. Kobayashi || EOS || align=right | 6.3 km || 
|-id=999 bgcolor=#fefefe
| 70999 ||  || — || December 7, 1999 || Fountain Hills || C. W. Juels || — || align=right | 3.6 km || 
|-id=000 bgcolor=#E9E9E9
| 71000 Hughdowns ||  ||  || December 7, 1999 || Fountain Hills || C. W. Juels || ADE || align=right | 7.9 km || 
|}

References

External links 
 Discovery Circumstances: Numbered Minor Planets (70001)–(75000) (IAU Minor Planet Center)

0070